= Prehistoric religion =

Religion before written records

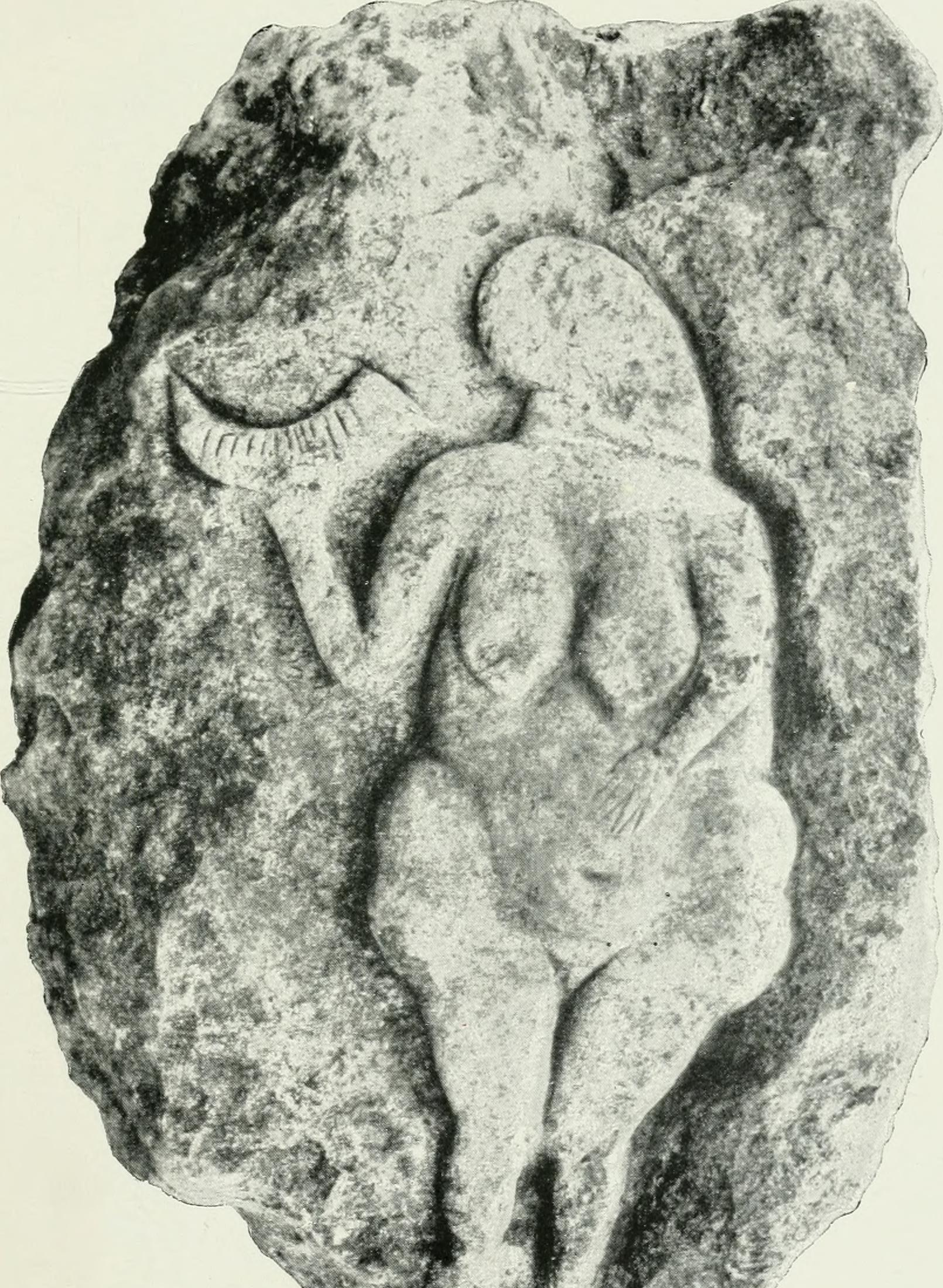
The Venus of Laussel, a stone relief of a seated woman

Prehistoric religion is the religious practice of prehistoric cultures. Prehistory, the period before written records, accounts for the bulk of human experience; over 99% of it occurred during the Paleolithic period alone. Prehistoric cultures spanned the globe and existed for over two and a half million years; their religious practices were many and varied, and studying them is difficult due to the lack of written records detailing their faiths.

The cognitive capacity for religion likely first emerged in Homo sapiens sapiens, or anatomically modern humans, although some scholars posit the existence of Neanderthal religion, and sparse evidence exists for earlier ritual practice. Excluding sparse and controversial evidence in the Middle Paleolithic (300,000–50,000 years ago), religion emerged with certainty in the Upper Paleolithic around 50,000 years ago. Upper Paleolithic religion was possibly shamanic, centered on the phenomenon of special spiritual leaders entering trance states to receive esoteric knowledge. These practices are extrapolated from the rich and complex body of art left by Paleolithic artists, particularly the elaborate cave art and enigmatic Venus figurines they produced.

The Neolithic Revolution, which established agriculture as the dominant way of life, occurred around 12,000 BC and ushered in the Neolithic. Neolithic society grew hierarchical and inegalitarian compared to its Paleolithic forebears, and their religious practices likely changed to suit. Neolithic religion may have become more structural and centralised than in the Paleolithic, and possibly engaged in ancestor worship both of one's individual ancestors and of the ancestors of entire groups, tribes, and settlements. A well-known feature of Neolithic religion is the stone circles in the British Isles and Brittany, of which the most prominent today is Stonehenge. A particularly notable feature of late-Neolithic through Chalcolithic religion is Proto-Indo-European mythology, the religion of the Proto-Indo-Europeans. The Proto-Indo-Europeans spoke the Proto-Indo-European language, which has been partially reconstructed through shared religious elements between early Indo-European language speakers.

Bronze Age and Iron Age religions are understood in part through archaeological records, but also, more so than in the Paleolithic and Neolithic, through written records; some societies had writing in these ages and were able to describe those that did not. These eras of prehistoric religion are the focus of modern reconstructionists, with many variants of modern pagan religions based on the pre-Christian practices of protohistoric Bronze and Iron Age societies.

== Background ==
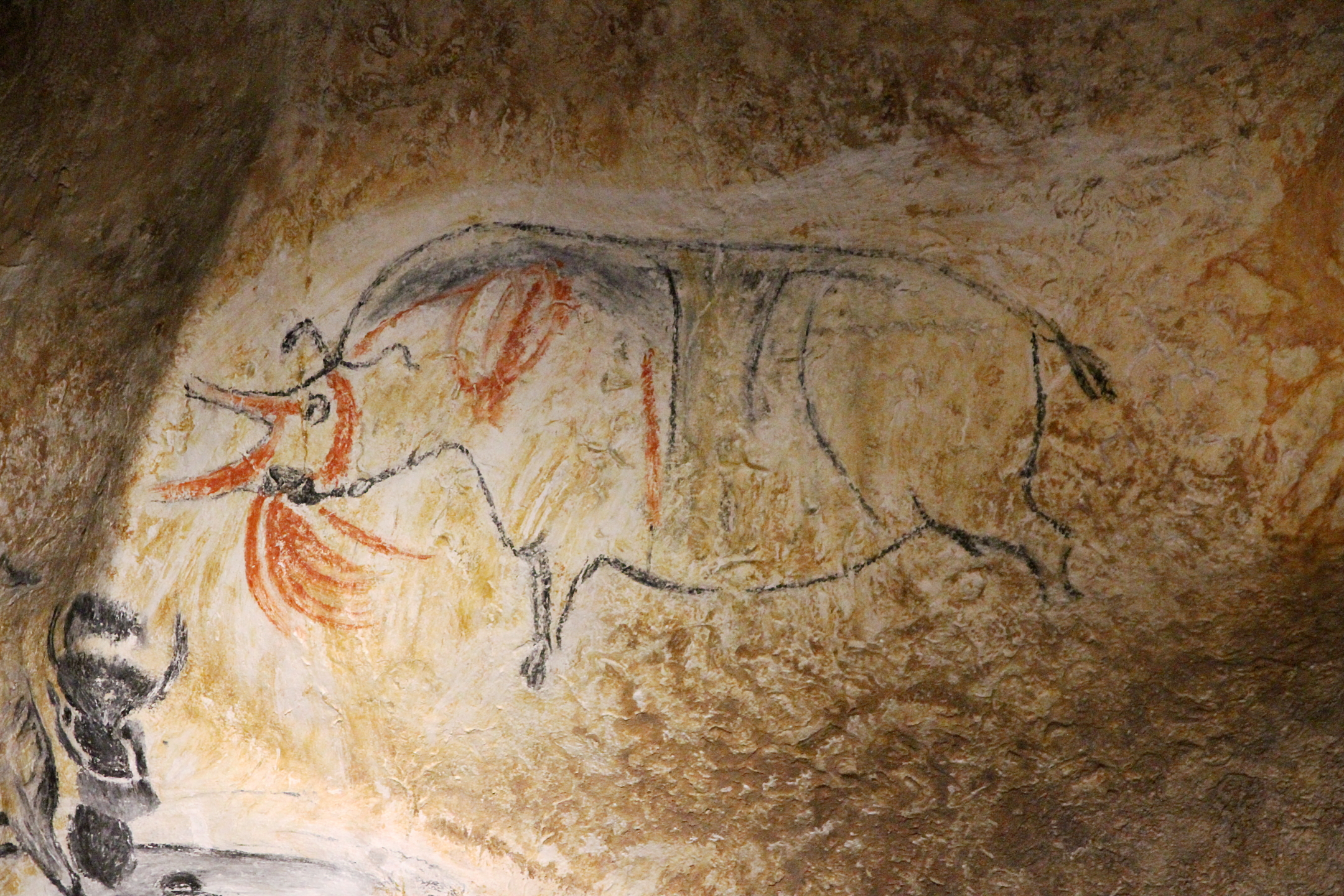
Rhinoceros cave painting with red ochre

Prehistory is the period in human history before the advent of written records. The lack of written evidence demands the use of archaeological evidence, which makes it difficult to extrapolate conclusive statements about religious belief. Much of the study of prehistoric religion is based on inferences from historic (textual) and ethnographic evidence, for example analogies between the religion of Paleolithic and modern hunter-gatherer societies. The usefulness of analogy in archaeological reasoning is theoretically complex and contested, but in the context of prehistoric religion can be strengthened by circumstantial evidence; for instance, it has been observed that red ochre was significant to many prehistoric societies and to modern hunter-gatherers.

Religion exists in all known human societies, but the study of prehistoric religion was popularised only around the end of the nineteenth century. A founder effect in prehistoric archaeology, a field pioneered by nineteenth-century secular humanists who found religion a threat to their evolution-based field of study, may have impeded the early attribution of a religious motive to prehistoric humans.

Prehistoric religion differs from the religious format known to most twenty-first-century commentators, which is based around orthodoxy and religious text. Rather, prehistoric religion, like later hunter-gatherer religion, possibly drew from shamanism, experiences of religious ecstasy, and animism. However, analyses indicate animism may have emerged earlier. Although the nature of prehistoric religion is speculative, the evidence left in the archaeological record is strongly suggestive of a visionary framework whereby faith is practised through entering trances, personal experience with deities, and other hallmarks of shamanism—to the point of some authors suggesting, in the words of archaeologist of shamanism Neil Price, that these tendencies and techniques are in some way hardwired into the human mind.

== Human evolution ==
The question of when religion emerged in the evolving psyche has long intrigued paleontologists. On the whole, neither the archaeological record nor the current understanding of how human intelligence evolved suggests early hominins (Note: This article uses the scientifically accurate 'hominin' to refer to early stages in human evolution, not the common but inaccurate 'hominid'.) had the cognitive capacity for spiritual belief. Religion was certainly present during the Upper Paleolithic period, dating to about 50,000 through 12,000 years ago, while religion during the Lower Paleolithic and Middle Paleolithic "belongs to the realm of legend".

In early research, Australopithecus, the first hominins to emerge in the fossil record, were thought to have sophisticated hunting patterns. These hunting patterns were extrapolated from those of modern hunter-gatherers, and in turn, anthropologists and archaeologists pattern-matched Australopithecus and peers to complex rituals surrounding such hunts. These assumptions were later disproved, and evidence suggesting Australopithecus and peers were capable of using tools such as fire was deemed coincidental. For several decades, prehistoricist consensus has opposed the idea of an Australopithecus faith. The first evidence of ritual emerges in the hominin genus Homo, which emerged between 2 and 3 million years ago and includes modern humans, their ancestors, and their closest relatives.

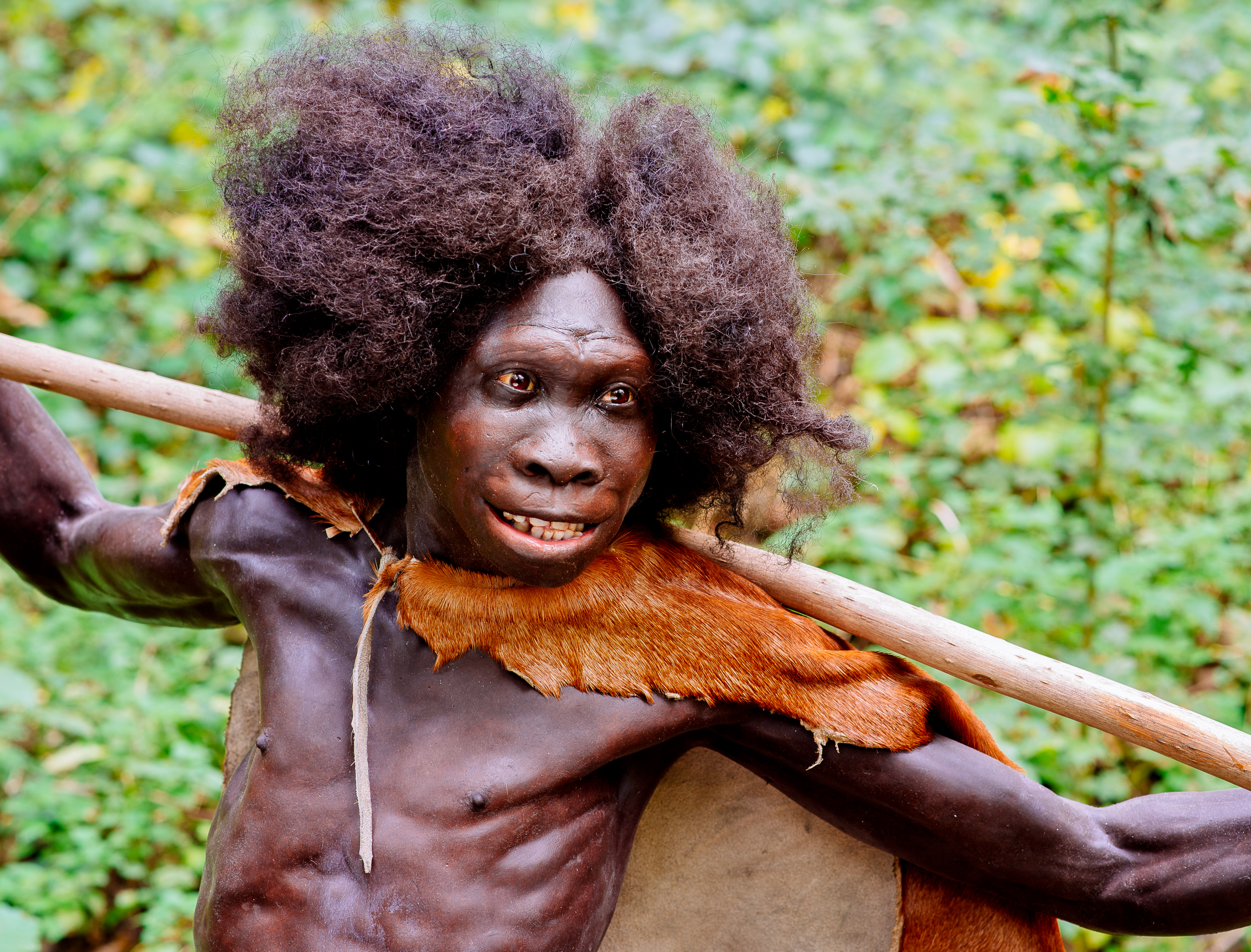
Reconstructed H. ergaster Turkana Boy

When the ritual shaded into the recognizably religious is unknown. The Lower and Middle Paleolithic periods, dominated by early Homo hominins, were an extraordinarily long period (from the emergence of Homo until 50,000 years before the present) of apparent cultural stability. No serious evidence for religious practice exists amongst Homo habilis, the first hominin to use tools. The picture complicates as Homo erectus emerges. H. erectus was the first hominid to have developed an appreciation for ritual, the intellectual ability to stem aggression of the kind seen in modern chimpanzees, and a sense of moral responsibility. Although the emergence of ritual in H. erectus "should not be understood as the full flowering of religious capacity", it marked a qualitative and quantitative change to its forebears. An area of particular scholarly interest is the evidence base for human cannibalism and ritual mutilation amongst H. erectus. Skulls found in Java and at the Chinese Zhoukoudian archaeological site bear evidence of tampering with the brain case in ways thought to correspond to the removal of the brain for cannibalistic purposes, as observed in hunter-gatherers. Perhaps more tellingly, in those sites and others, a number of H. erectus skulls show signs suggesting that the skin and flesh were cut away from the skull in predetermined patterns. These patterns, unlikely to occur by chance, are, in turn, associated with ritual.

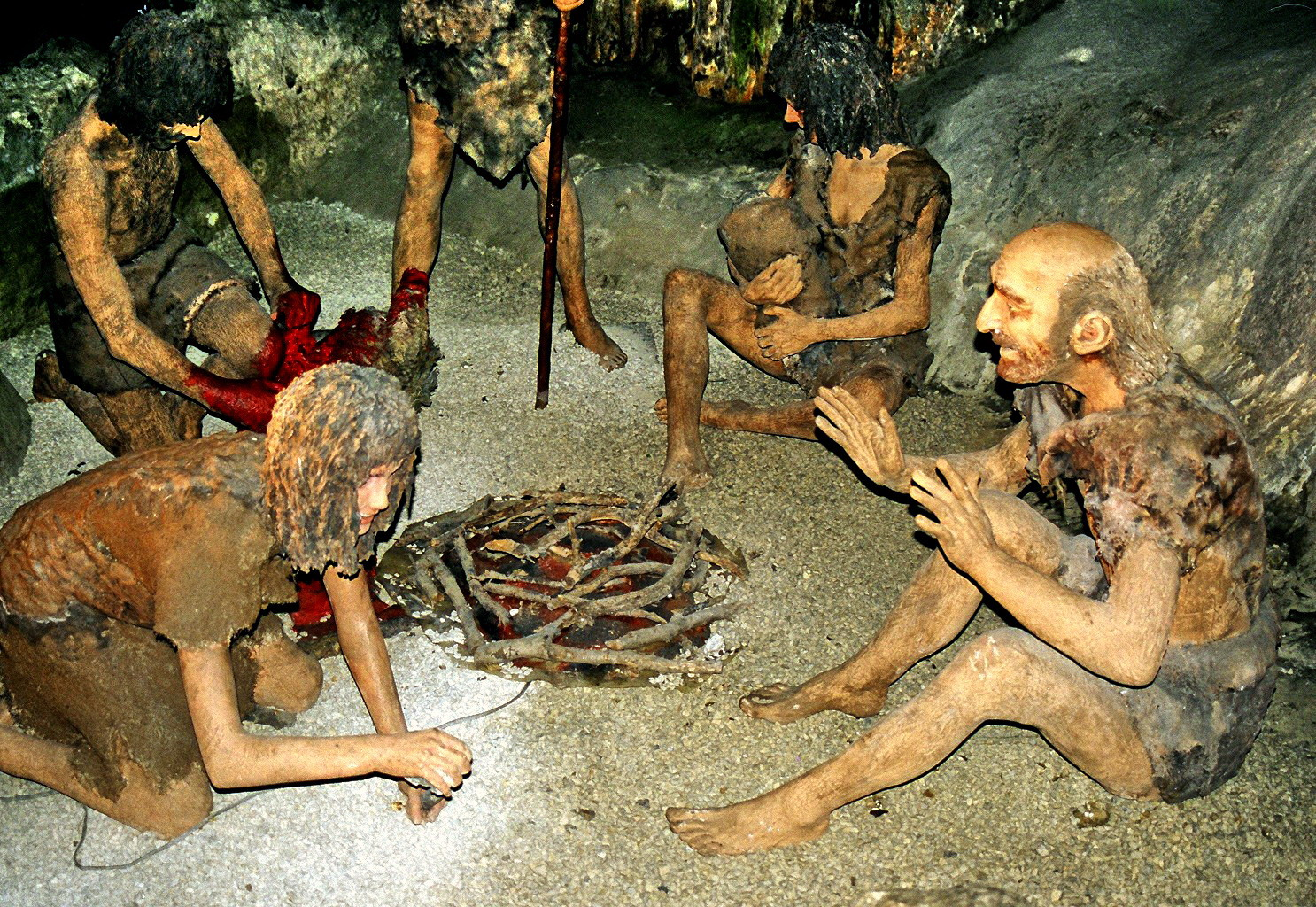
Reconstructed Neanderthals of St. Michael's Cave, Gibraltar

The lineage leading to anatomically modern humans originated around 500,000 years ago. Modern humans are classified taxonomically as Homo sapiens sapiens. This classification is controversial, as it runs counter to traditional subspecies classifications; no other hominins have been treated as uncontroversial members of H. sapiens. The 2003 description of Homo sapiens idaltu drew attention as a relatively clear case of a H. sapiens subspecies but was disputed by authors such as Chris Stringer. Neanderthals, in particular, pose a taxonomic problem. The classification of Neanderthals, a close relative of anatomically modern humans, as Homo neanderthalensis or Homo sapiens neanderthalensis is a decades-long matter of dispute. Neanderthals and H. s. sapiens were able to interbreed, a trait associated with membership in the same species, and around 2% of the modern human genome is composed of Neanderthal DNA. However, strong negative selection existed against the direct offspring of Neanderthals and H. s. sapiens, consistent with the reduced fertility seen in hybrid species such as mules; this has been used as a recent argument against the classification of Neanderthals as a H. sapiens subspecies.

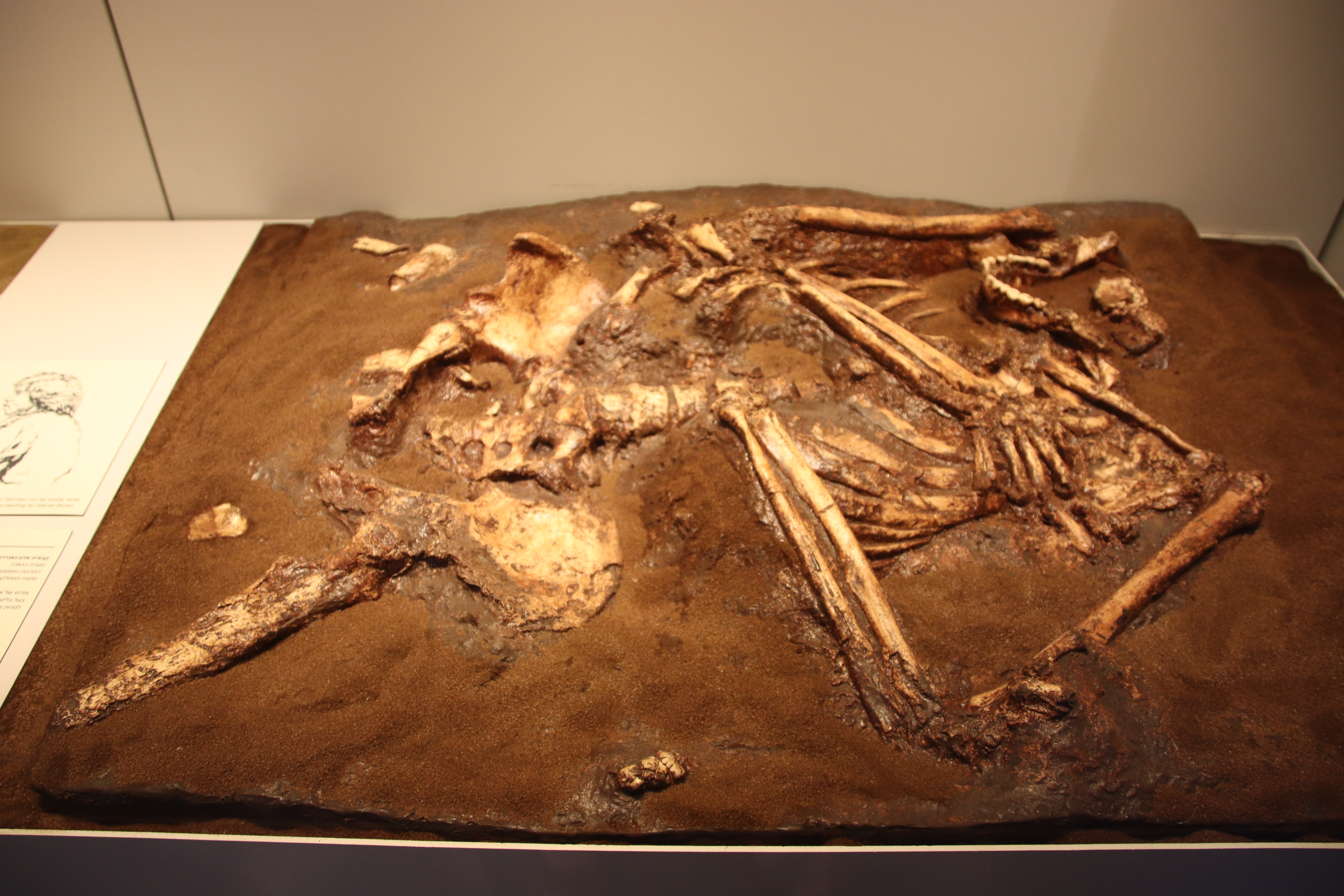
Cast of Neanderthal burial

The study of Neanderthal ritual, as proxy and preface for religion, revolves around death and burial rites. The first undisputed burials, approximately 150,000 years ago, were performed by Neanderthals. The limits of the archaeological record stymie extrapolation from burial to funeral rites, though evidence of grave goods and unusual markings on bones suggest funerary practices. In addition to funerals, a growing body of evidence suggests that Neanderthals used bodily ornamentation with pigments, feathers, and even claws. As such, ornamentation is not preserved in the archaeological record; it is understood only by comparison to modern hunter-gatherers, where it often corresponds to rituals of spiritual significance. Unlike H. s. sapiens over equivalent periods, Neanderthal society—as preserved in the archaeological record—is one of remarkable stability, with little change in tool design over hundreds of thousands of years. Neanderthal cognition, as backfilled from genetic and skeletal evidence, is thought to be rigid and simplistic compared to that of contemporary, let alone modern, H. s. sapiens. By extension, Neanderthal ritual is speculated to have been a teaching mechanism that resulted in an unchanging culture, by embedding a learning style wherein orthopraxy dominated in thought, life, and culture. This is contrasted with prehistoric H. s. sapiens religious ritual, which is understood as an extension of art, culture, and intellectual curiosity.

Archaeologists such as Brian Hayden interpret Neanderthal burial as suggestive of both belief in an afterlife and of ancestor worship. Hayden also interprets Neanderthals as engaging in bear worship, a hypothesis driven by the common finding of cave bear remains around Neanderthal habitats and by the frequency of such worship amongst cold-dwelling hunter-gatherer societies. Cave excavations throughout the twentieth century found copious bear remains in and around Neanderthal habitats, including stacked skulls, bear bones around human graves, and patterns of skeletal remains consistent with animal skin displays. Other archaeologists, such as Ina Wunn, find the evidence for the "bear cult" unconvincing. Wunn interprets Neanderthals as a pre-religious people and the presence of bear remains around Neanderthal habitats as a coincidental association; as cave bears, by their nature, dwell in caves, their bones should be expected to be found there. The broader archaeological evidence overall suggests that bear worship was not a major factor in Paleolithic religion.

In recent years, genetic and neurological research has expanded the study of the emergence of religion. In 2018, the cultural anthropologist Margaret Boone Rappaport published her analysis of the sensory, neurological, and genetic differences between the great apes, Neanderthals, H. s. sapiens, and H. s. idaltu. She interprets the H. s. sapiens brain and genome as having a unique capacity for religion through characteristics such as expanded parietal lobes, greater cognitive flexibility, and an extensive capacity for both altruism and aggression. In Rappaport's framework, only H. s. sapiens of the hominins is capable of religion for much the same reason as the tools and artworks of prehistoric H. s. sapiens are finer and more detailed than those of their Neanderthal contemporaries; all are products of a unique cognition.

== Lower and Middle Paleolithic: precursors to religion ==
The Paleolithic, sometimes called the Old Stone Age, makes up over 99% of humanity's history. Lasting from approximately 2.5 million years ago through to 10,000 BC, the Paleolithic comprises the emergence of the Homo genus, the evolution of mankind, and the emergence of art, technology, and culture. The Paleolithic is broadly divided into Lower, Middle, and Upper periods. The Lower Paleolithic (2.5 mya–300,000 BC) sees the emergence of stone tools, the evolution of Australopithecus, Homo habilis, and Homo erectus, and the first dispersal of humanity from Africa; the Middle Paleolithic (300,000 BC–50,000 BC) the apparent beginnings of culture and art alongside the emergence of Neanderthals and anatomically modern humans; the Upper Paleolithic (50,000 BC–10,000 BC) a sharp flourishing of culture, the emergence of sophisticated and elaborate art, jewellery, and clothing, and the worldwide dispersal of Homo sapiens sapiens. (Note: The Lower/Middle/Upper division is not uncontroversial. A subset of paleontologists find these traditional divisions Eurocentric, and instead work on an "Early/Middle/Late" Paleolithic division. The divisions are particularly contentious in East Asian paleontology, although support nonetheless exists for the use of the Lower/Middle/Upper division in the East Asian context.)

=== Lower Paleolithic ===
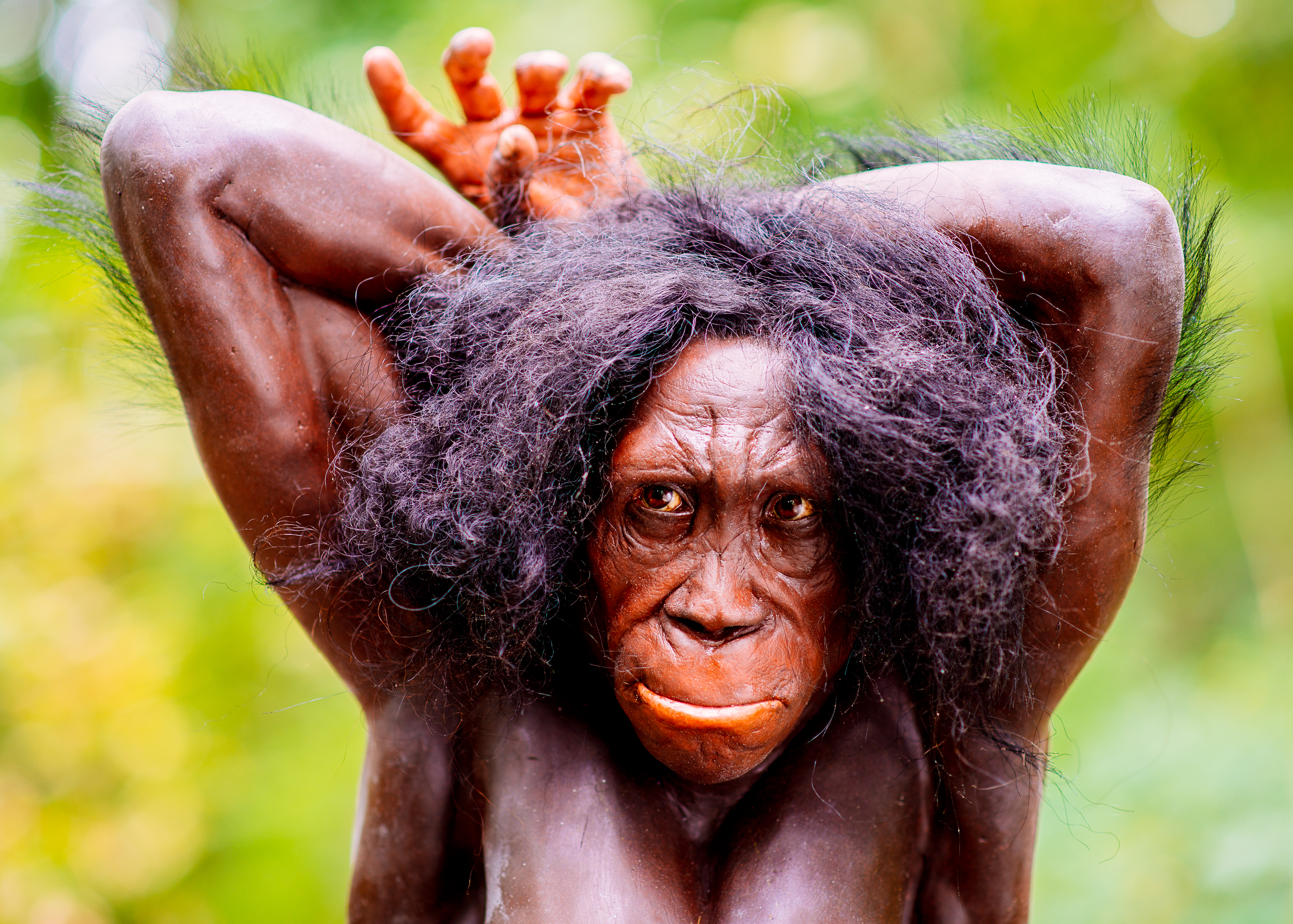
Reconstructed Australopithecus sediba man

Religion prior to the Upper Paleolithic is speculative, and the Lower Paleolithic in particular has no clear evidence of religious practice. Not even the loosest evidence for ritual exists prior to 500,000 years before the present, though archaeologist Gregory J. Wightman notes the limits of the archaeological record means their practice cannot be thoroughly ruled out. The early hominins of the Lower Paleolithic—an era well before the emergence of H. s. sapiens—slowly gained, as they began to collaborate and work in groups, the ability to control and mediate their emotional responses. Their rudimentary sense of collaborative identity laid the groundwork for the later social aspects of religion.

Australopithecus, the first hominins, (Note: Predating even Australopithecus was Ardipithecus, which is conceptualised as a hominin by some authors, but whose place in the lineage is a matter of dispute.) were a pre-religious people. Though twentieth-century historian of religion Mircea Eliade felt that even this earliest branch on the human evolutionary line "had a certain spiritual awareness", the twenty-first century's understanding of Australopithecene cognition does not permit the level of abstraction necessary for spiritual experience. For all that the hominins of the Lower Paleolithic are read as incapable of spirituality, some writers read the traces of their behaviour such as to permit an understanding of ritual, even as early as Australopithecus. Durham University professor of archaeology Paul Pettitt reads the AL 333 fossils, a group of Australopithecus afarensis found together near Hadar, Ethiopia, as perhaps deliberately moved to the area as a mortuary practice. Later Lower Paleolithic remains have also been interpreted as bearing associations of funerary rites, particularly cannibalism. Though archaeologist Kit W. Wesler states "there is no evidence in the Lower Paleolithic of the kind of cultural elaboration that would imply a rich imagination or the level of intelligence of modern humans", he discusses the findings of Homo heidelbergensis bones at Sima de los Huesos and the evidence stretching from Germany to China for cannibal practices amongst Lower Paleolithic humans.

A number of skulls found in archaeological excavations of Lower Paleolithic sites across diverse regions have had significant proportions of the brain cases broken away. Writers such as Hayden speculate that this marks cannibalistic tendencies of religious significance; Hayden, deeming cannibalism "the most parsimonious explanation", compares the behaviour to hunter-gatherer tribes described in written records to whom brain-eating bore spiritual significance. By extension, he reads the skull's damage as evidence of Lower Paleolithic ritual practice. For the opposite position, Wunn finds the cannibalism hypothesis bereft of factual backing; she interprets the patterns of skull damage as a matter of what skeletal parts are more or less preserved over the course of thousands or millions of years. Even within the cannibalism framework, she argues that the practice would be more comparable to brain-eating in chimpanzees than in hunter-gatherers. In the 2010s, the study of Paleolithic cannibalism grew more complex due to new methods of archaeological interpretation, which led to the conclusion much Paleolithic cannibalism was for nutritional rather than ritual reasons.

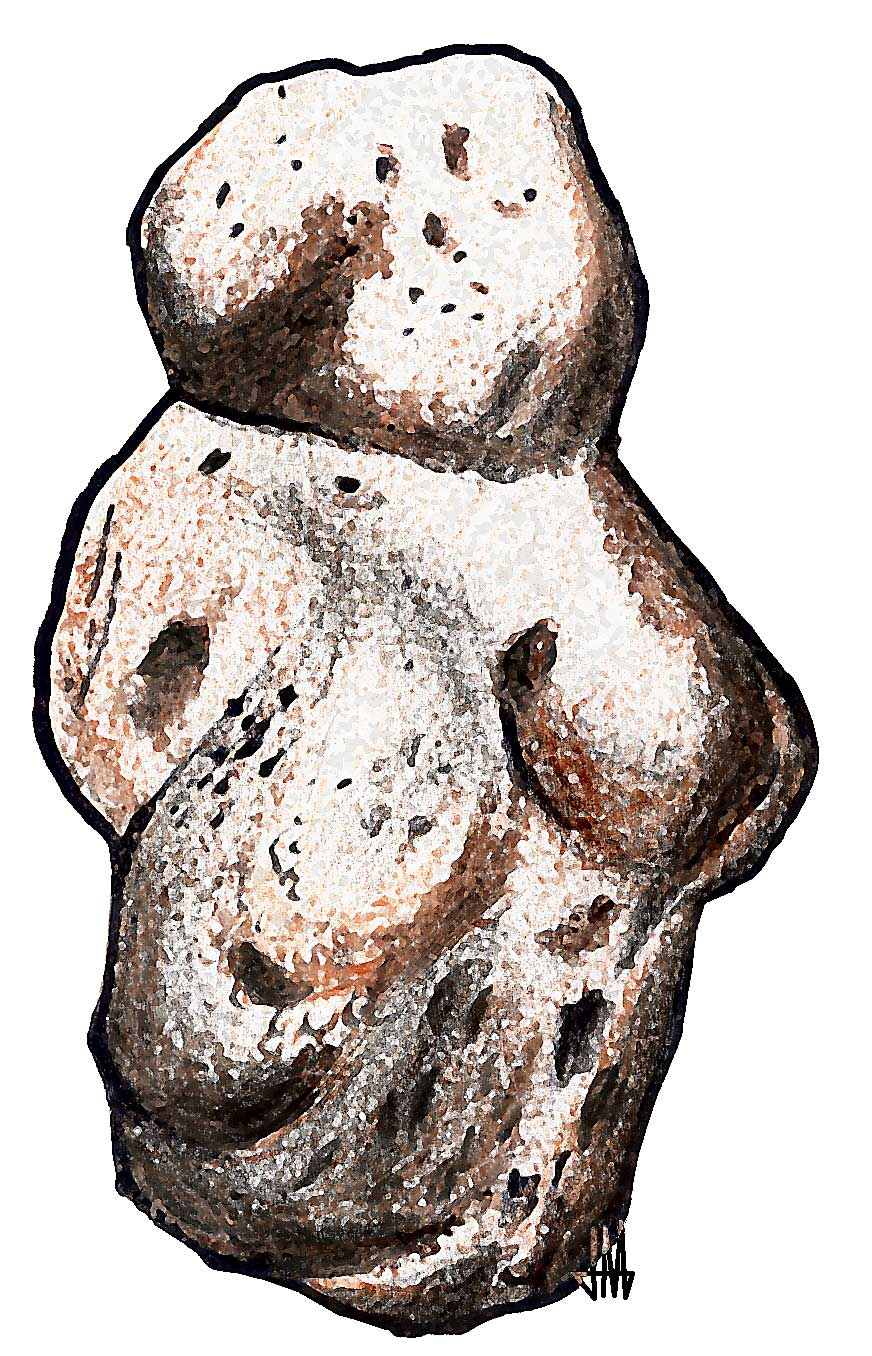
Venus of Berekhat Ram

In the Upper Paleolithic, religion is associated with symbolism and sculpture. One Upper Paleolithic remnant that draws cultural attention are the Venus figurines, carved statues of nude women speculated to represent deities, fertility symbols, or ritual fetish objects. Archaeologists have proposed the existence of Lower Paleolithic Venus figurines. The Venus of Berekhat Ram is one such highly speculative figure, a scoria dated 300–350 thousand years ago (Note: The precise timeframe of the Venus of Berekhat Ram is unclear. It was between 230,000 and 780,000 years ago, as determined by the age of the layers of volcanic ash it was found embedded in.) with several grooves interpreted as resembling a woman's torso and head. Scanning electron microscopy found the Venus of Berekhat Ram's grooves consistent with those that would be produced by contemporary flint tools. Pettitt argues that though the figurine "can hardly be described as artistically achieved", it and other speculative Venuses of the Lower Paleolithic, such as the Venus of Tan-Tan, demand further scrutiny for their implications for contemporary theology. These figurines were possibly produced by H. heidelbergensis, whose brain sizes were not far behind those of Neanderthals and H. s. sapiens, and have been analysed for their implications for the artistic understanding of such early hominins.

The tail end of the Lower Paleolithic saw a cognitive and cultural shift. The emergence of revolutionary technologies such as fire, coupled with the course of human evolution extending development to include a true childhood and improved bonding between mother and infant, perhaps broke new ground in cultural terms. It is in the last few hundred thousand years of the period that the archaeological record begins to demonstrate hominins as creatures that influence their environment as much as they are influenced by it. Later Lower Paleolithic hominins built wind shelters to protect themselves from the elements; they collected unusual natural objects; they began the use of pigments such as red ochre. These shifts do not coincide with species-level evolutionary leaps, being observed in both H. heidelbergensis and H. erectus. Different authors interpret these shifts with different levels of skepticism, some seeing them as a spiritual revolution and others as simply the beginning of the beginning. While the full significance of these changes is difficult to discern, they clearly map to an advance in cognitive capacity in the directions that eventually led to religion.

=== Middle Paleolithic ===
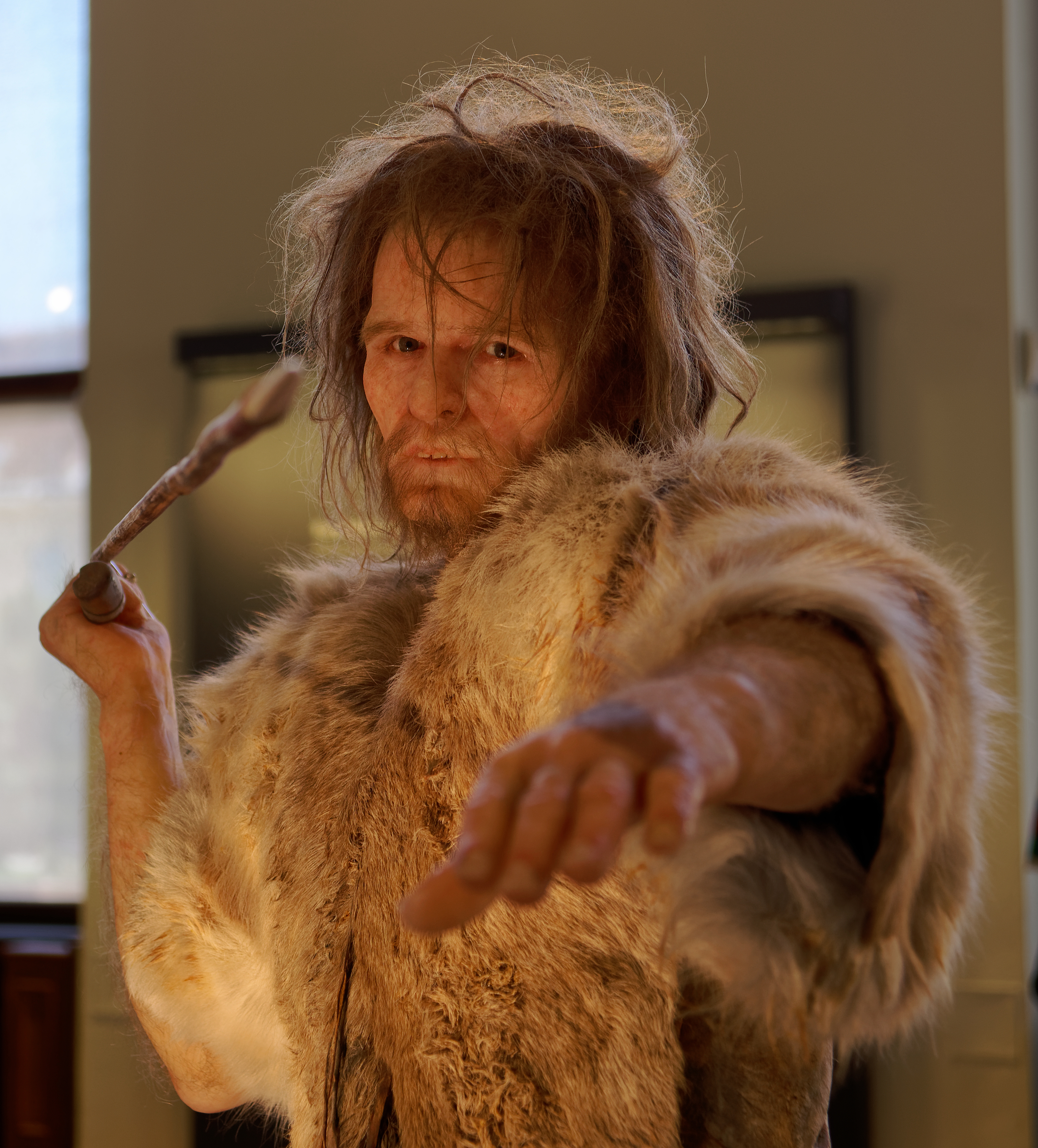
Reconstructed Middle Paleolithic Neanderthal man

The Middle Paleolithic was the era of coterminous Neanderthal and H. s. sapiens (anatomically modern human) habitation. H. s. sapiens originated in Africa and Neanderthals in Eurasia; over the course of the period, H. s. sapiens range expanded to areas formerly dominated by Neanderthals, eventually supplanting them and ushering in the Upper Paleolithic. Much is unknown about Neanderthal cognition, particularly the capacities that would give rise to religion. Religious interpretations of Neanderthals have discussed their possibly-ritual use of caves, their burial practices, and religious practices amongst H. s. sapiens hunter-gatherer tribes in recorded history considered to have similar lifestyles to Neanderthals. Pre-religious interpretations of Neanderthals argue their archaeological record suggests a lack of creativity or supernatural comprehension, that Neanderthal-associated archaeological findings are too quickly ascribed religious motive, and that the genetic and neurological remnants of Neanderthal skeletons do not permit the cognitive complexity required for religion.

While the Neanderthals dominated Europe, Middle Paleolithic H. s. sapiens ruled Africa. Middle Paleolithic H. s. sapiens, like its Neanderthal contemporaries, bears little obvious trace of religious practice. The art, tools, and stylistic practice of the era's H. s. sapiens are not suggestive of the complexity necessary for spiritual belief and practice. However, the Middle Paleolithic is long, and the H. s. sapiens who lived in it heterogeneous. Models of behavioural modernity disagree on how humanity became behaviourally and cognitively sophisticated, whether as a sudden emergence in the Upper Paleolithic or a slow process over the last hundred thousand years of the Middle Paleolithic; supporters of the second hypothesis point to evidence of increasing cultural, ritual, and spiritual sophistication 150,000–50,000 years ago.

==== Neanderthals ====
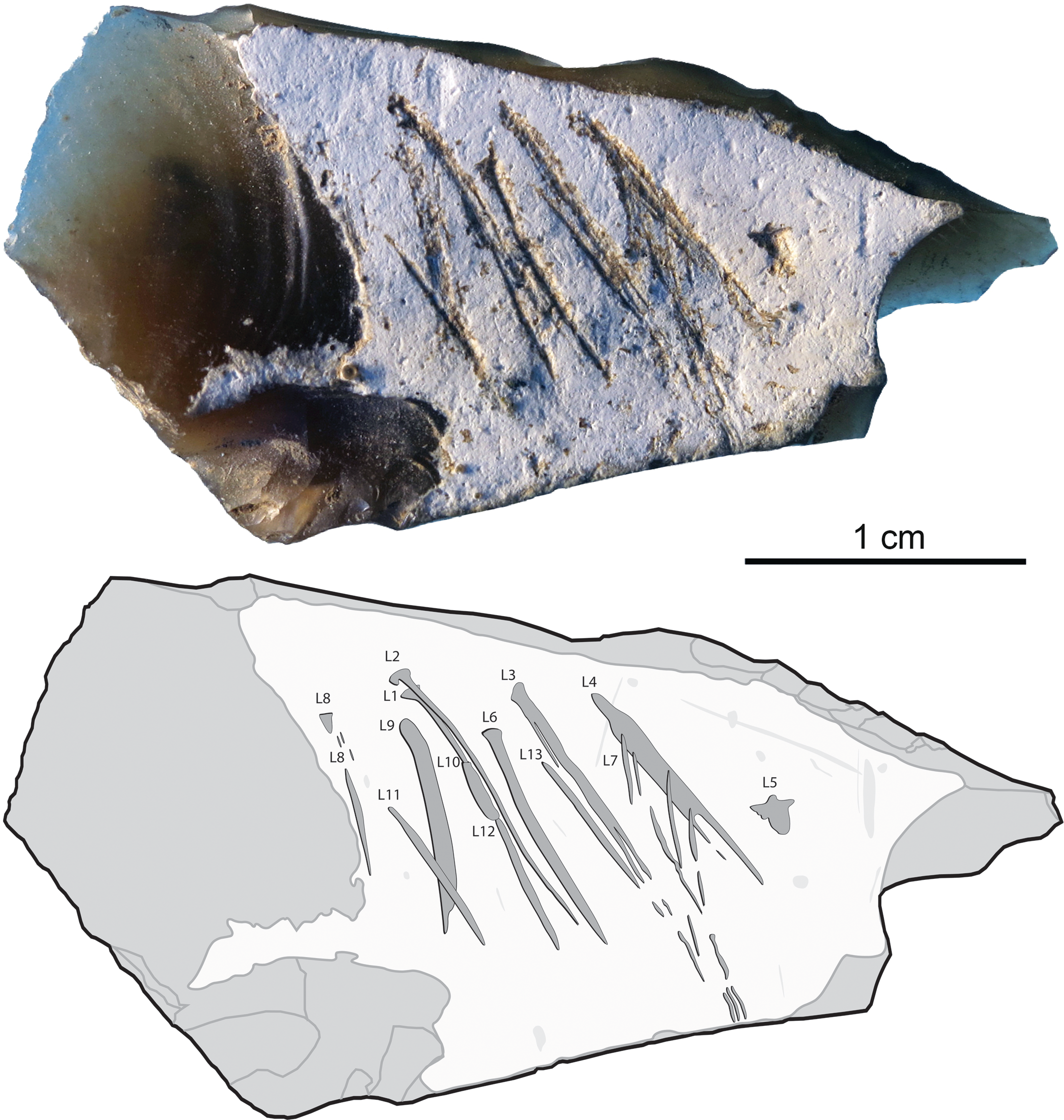
Neanderthal-made engraved flint, found in a child's grave

Neanderthals were the earliest hominins (Note: Inconsistencies occur with Homo naledi, an Australopithecus-like small-brained early member of Homo. Evidence suggests H. naledi may have buried their dead, a practice difficult to disambiguate from afterlife belief and religious significance; this has been read as indicative of the emergence of abstract and symbolic thought far earlier in human evolution than previously thought. The H. naledi burials are controversial, and research aided by machine learning suggests they may have been coincidence.) to bury their dead, although not the chronologically first burials, as earlier burials (such as those of the Skhul and Qafzeh hominins) are recorded amongst early H. s. sapiens. Though relatively few Neanderthal burials are known, spaced thousands of years apart over broad geographical ranges, Hayden argues them undeniable hallmarks of spiritual recognition and "clear indications of concepts of the afterlife". Though Pettitt is more cautious about the significance of Neanderthal burial, he deems it a sophisticated and "more than prosaic" practice. Pettitt deems the Neanderthals of at least southwest France, Germany, and the Levant possessive of clear mortuary rites he presumes linked to an underlying belief system. He calls particular attention to potential grave markers found around Neanderthal burials, particularly those of children, at La Ferrassie in Dordogne.

One matter discussed in the context of Neanderthal burial is grave goods, objects placed in graves that are frequently seen in early religious cultures. Outside of the controversial Shanidar IV "flower burial", now considered coincidence, Neanderthals are not seen to bury their dead with grave goods. However, a burial of an adult and child of the Kizil-Koba culture was accompanied by a flint stone with markings. In 2018, a team at the French National Centre for Scientific Research published their analysis that the markings were intentionally made and possibly held symbolic significance.

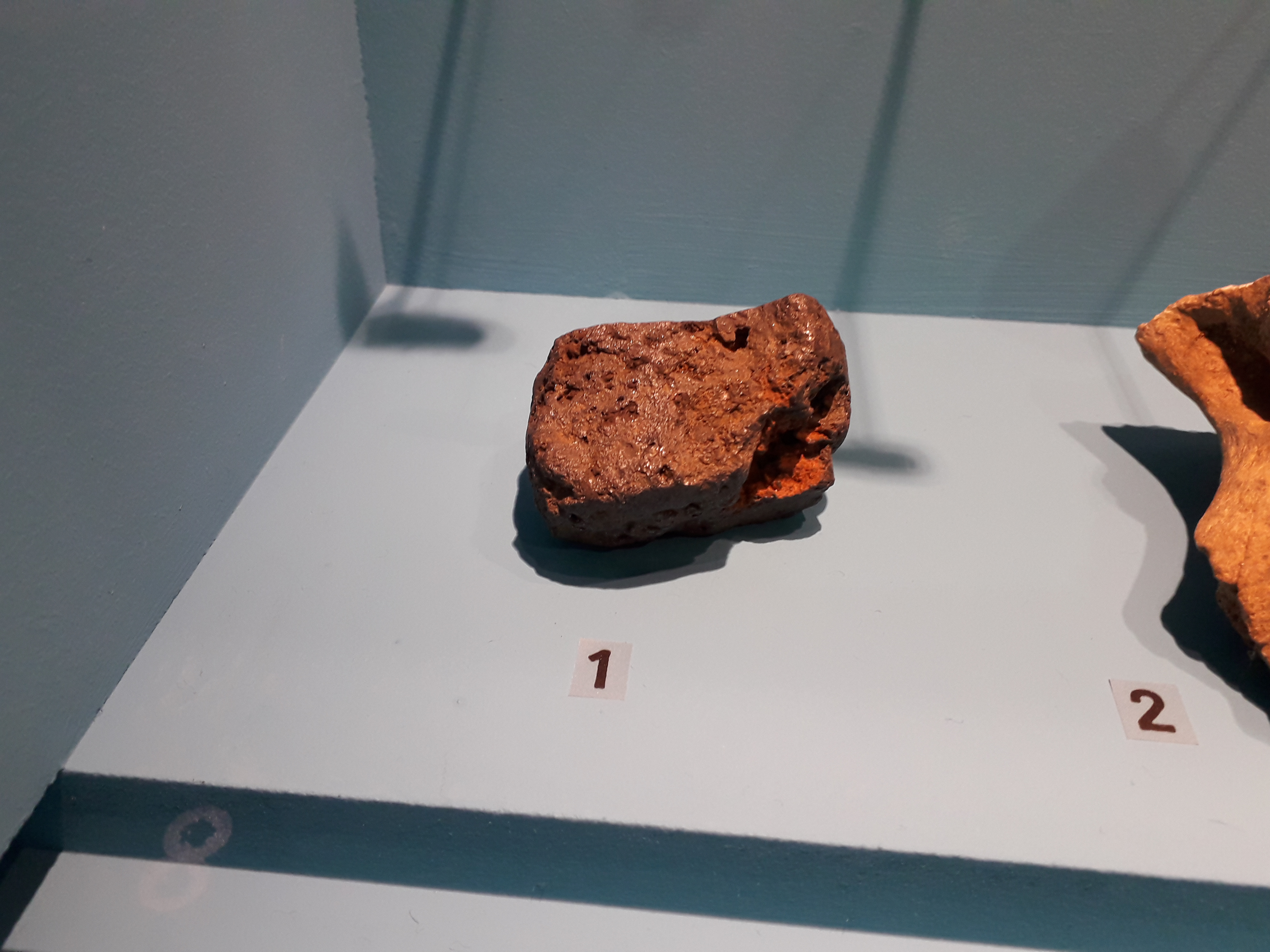
Red pigments found in Grottes du Pech-de-l'Azé

The archaeological record preserves Neanderthal associations with red pigments and quartz crystals. Hayden states "it is inconceivable to me that early hunting and gathering groups would have been painting images or decorating their bodies without some kind of symbolic or religious framework for such activities"; he draws comparison to the use of red ochre amongst those modern hunter-gatherers to whom it represents a sacred colour. He similarly connects quartz collection to religious use of crystals in later shamanic practice. Not all writers are as convinced that this represents underlying spiritual experience. To Mark Nielsen, evidence of ritual practice amongst Neanderthals does not represent religion; he interprets their cultural remnants, such as the rare cave art they produced, as insufficiently sophisticated for such comprehension. Rather, Neanderthal orthopraxy is a cultural teaching mechanism that permitted their unusually stable culture, existing at the same technological level for hundreds of thousands of years during rapid H. s. sapiens change. To Nielsen, Neanderthal ritual is how they preserved an intractable culture via teachings passed down through generations.

Ultimately, Neanderthal religion is speculative, and hard evidence for religious practice exists only amongst Upper Paleolithic H. s. sapiens. Though Hayden and to some degree Pettitt take a spiritualised interpretation of Neanderthal culture, these interpretations are unclear at best; as Pettitt says, "the very real possibility exists that religion sensu stricto is a unique characteristic of symbolically and linguistically empowered Homo sapiens". Other writers, such as Wunn, find the concept of Neanderthal religion "mere speculation" that at best is an optimistic interpretation of the archaeological record. What ritual Neanderthals had, rather than supernatural, is oft interpreted as a mechanism of teaching and social bonding. Matt J. Rossano, defining Neanderthal practice as "proto-religion", compares it to "purely mimetic community activities" such as marching, sports, and concerts. He understands it not as a veneration of spirits or deities, but rather a bonding and social ritual that would later evolve into supernatural faith.

In 2019 Gibraltarian palaeoanthropologists Stewart, Geraldine and Clive Finlayson and Spanish archaeologist Francisco Guzmán speculated that the golden eagle had iconic value to Neanderthals, as exemplified in some modern human societies because they reported that golden eagle bones had a conspicuously high rate of evidence of modification compared to the bones of other birds. They then proposed some "Cult of the Sun Bird" where the golden eagle was a symbol of power.

==== Homo sapiens sapiens ====
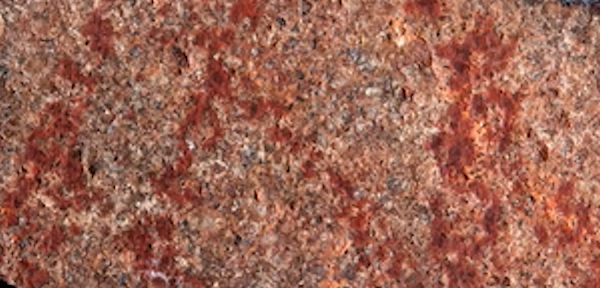
73,000-year-old red marks on stone, the oldest known H. s. sapiens art

H. s. sapiens emerged in Africa as early as 300,000 years ago. In the Middle Paleolithic, particularly its first couple hundred thousand years, the archaeological record of H. s. sapiens is barely distinguishable from their Neanderthal and H. heidelbergensis contemporaries. Though these first H. s. sapiens demonstrated some ability to construct shelter, use pigments, and collect artifacts, they yet lacked the behavioural sophistication associated with humans today. The process through which H. s. sapiens became cognitively and culturally sophisticated is known as behavioural modernity. The emergence of behavioural modernity is unclear; traditionally conceptualised as a sudden shock around the beginning of the Upper Paleolithic, modern accounts more often understand it as a slow process throughout the late Middle Paleolithic.

Where behavioural modernity is conceptualised as originating in the Middle Paleolithic, some authors also push back the traditional framework of religion's origin to account for it. Wightman discusses Wonderwerk Cave in South Africa, inhabited 180,000 years ago by early H. s. sapiens and filled with unusual objects such as quartz crystals and inscribed stones. He argues these may have been ritual artifacts that served as foci for rites performed by these early humans. Wightman is even more enraptured by the Botswanan Tsodilo—sacred to modern hunter-gatherers—which primarily houses Upper Paleolithic paintings and artifacts, but has objects stretching back far earlier. Middle Paleolithic spearheads have been found in Tsodilo's Rhino Cave, many of which were distinctly painted and some of which had apparently travelled long distances with nomadic hunter-gatherers. Rhino Cave presents unusual rock formations that modern hunter-gatherers understand as spiritually significant, and Wightman hypothesises this sense may have been shared by their earliest forebears. He is also curious about the emergence of cave art towards the very end of the Middle Paleolithic, where drawings and traces of red ochre finally emerge 50,000 years ago; this art, the first remnants of true human creativity, would usher in the Upper Paleolithic and the birth of complex religion.

== Upper Paleolithic ==
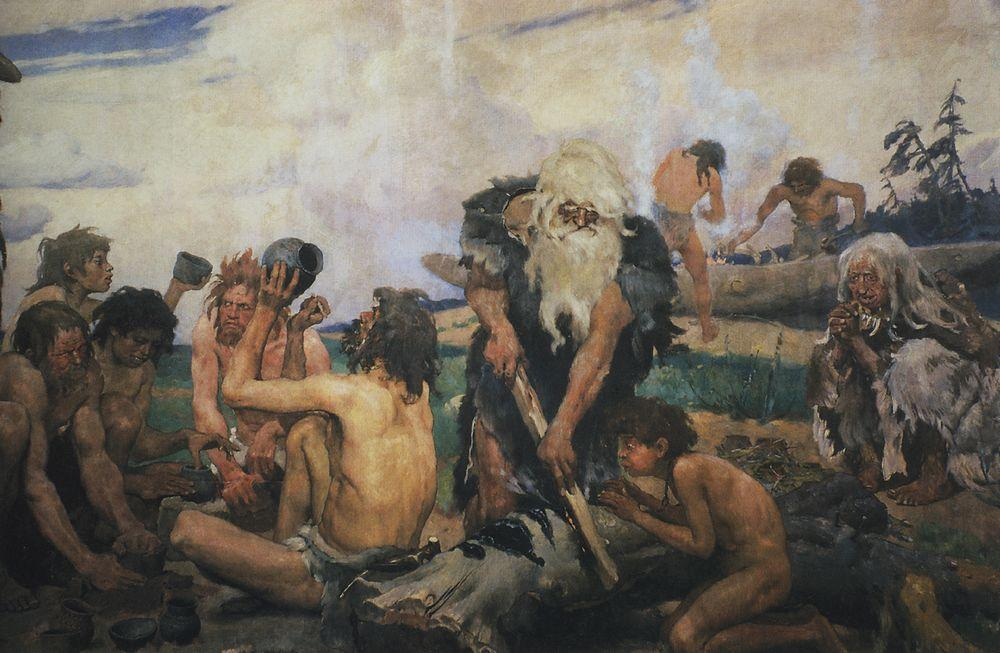
Viktor Vasnetsov's impression of a Paleolithic gathering

The emergence of the Upper Paleolithic c. 40,000–50,000 years ago was a time of explosive development. The Upper Paleolithic saw the worldwide emergence of H. s. sapiens as the sole species of humanity, displacing their Neanderthal contemporaries across Eurasia and travelling to previously human-uninhabited territories such as Australia. The complexity of stone tools grew, and the production of complex art, sculpture, and decoration began. Long-distance trade networks emerged to connect communities that had complex house-like habitations and food storage networks.

True religion made its clear emergence during this period of flourishing. Rossano, following in the footsteps of other authors, ascribes this to shamanism. He draws a line between pre-Upper Paleolithic social bonding rituals and faith healing, where the latter is an evolution of the former. Gesturing at the universality of faith healing concepts in hunter-gatherer societies throughout recorded history, as well as their tendencies to involve the altered states of consciousness ascribed to shamanism and their placebo effect on psychologically inspired pain, he conjectures that these rituals were the first truly supernatural tendency to reveal itself to the human psyche. Price refers to an extension of this as the "neuropsychological model", where shamanism is conceptualised as hard-wired in the human mind. Though some authors are unsympathetic to the neuropsychological model, Price finds a strong basis for some psychological underpinning to shamanism.

=== Art ===
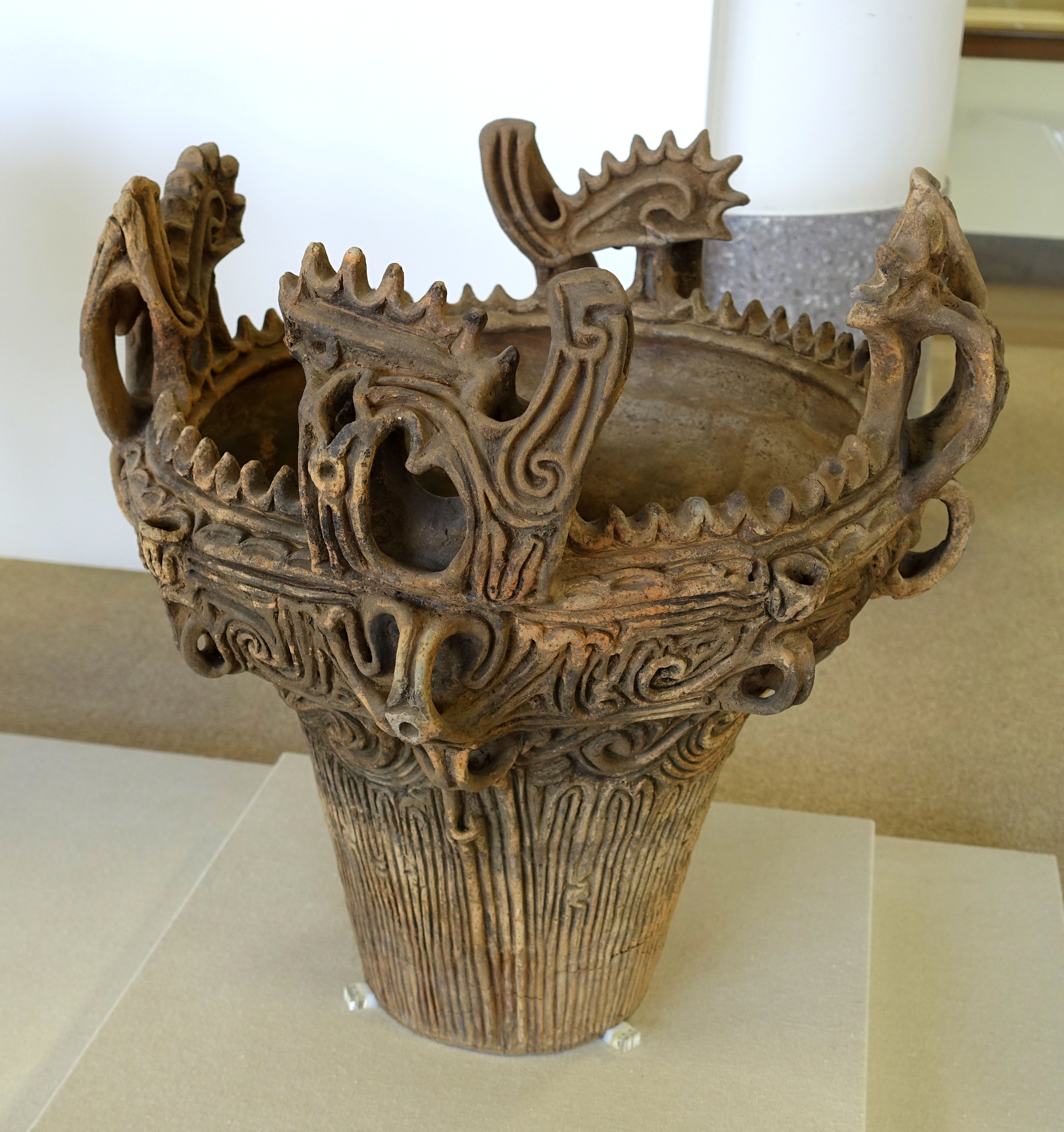
Pottery of Middle Jōmon hunter-gatherers in Japan

Upper Paleolithic humans produced complex paintings, sculptures, and other art forms, many of which held apparent ritual significance. Religious interpretations of such objects, especially "portable art" such as figurines, varies. Some writers view virtually all such art as spiritual, while others read only a minority of it as such, preferring more mundane functions for the majority.

The study of religious art in the Upper Paleolithic focuses in particular on cave art—referred to alternatively by some writers (such as David S. Whitley) as "rock art", as not all of it was produced on cave walls rather than rock formations elsewhere. Cave art is frequently conceptualised as a tool of shamanism. This model, the "mind in the cave" conjecture, sees much cave art as produced in altered states of consciousness as a tool to connect the artist with the spirit realm. Visionary cave art, as shamanic art is referred to, is characterised by unnatural imagery such as animal-human hybrids, and by recurring themes such as sex, death, flight, and physical transformation.

Not all religious cave art depicts shamanic experience. Cave art is also connected, by analogy with modern hunter-gatherers, to initiation rituals; a painting depicting an animal may have a deeper symbolic meaning for members of a tribe, whereas for those involved in smaller secret societies it may have a deeper symbolic meaning. Comparative evidence for this form of cave art is difficult to gather, as secret societies by definition do not share their nature with outsider anthropologists. In some cases, the lifestyles of modern hunter-gatherers have been rendered so peripheral as to lose that knowledge entirely. Nonetheless, these arts are still studied, and general ideas can still be concluded; concepts associated with secret society cave art include ancestor figures, animals as metaphors, and long-distance travel. (Note: Regarding the specific matter of cave art depicting animals, study of cave painting sites in southwest France (a particularly rich location for Paleolithic religion) finds distinctive patterns of placement. Bison, aurochs, horses, and mammoths tended to be painted in clear and central locations within caves, while deer, ibex, and bears were in more peripheral and inaccessible locations. Felines were located exclusively in the hardest-to-reach places.)

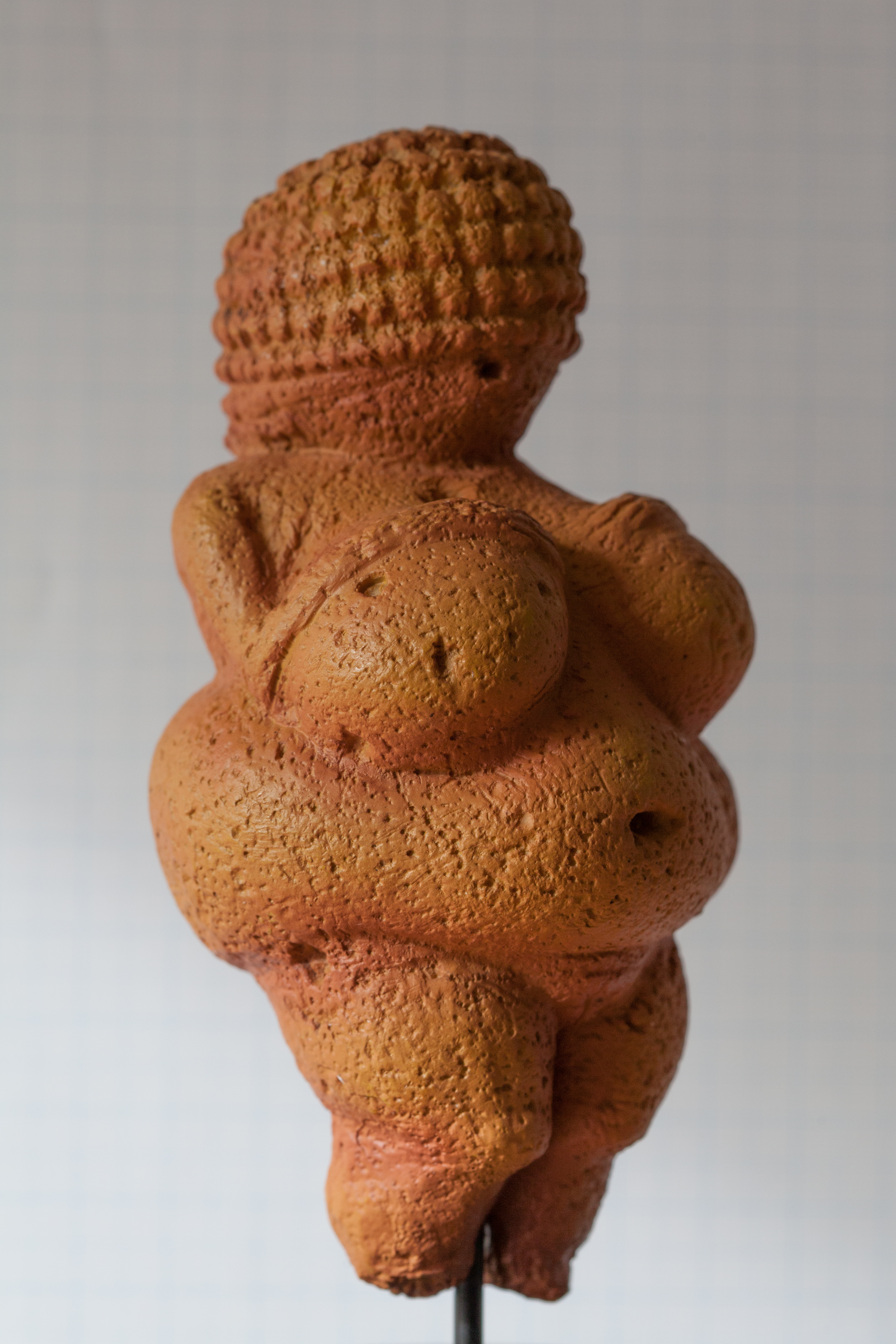
Venus of Willendorf

Another art form of probable religious significance is the Venus figurines. These are hand-held statuettes of nude women found in Upper Paleolithic sites across Eurasia, which are speculated to have significance in fertility rites. Though separated by thousands of years and kilometres, Venus figurines across the Upper Paleolithic share consistent features. They focus on the midsections of their subjects; the faces are blank or abstract, and the hands and feet are small. Despite the near-nonexistence of obesity amongst hunter-gatherers, many depict realistically rendered obese subjects. The figures are universally women, often nude, and frequently pregnant. (Note: Figurines that do not fit this description have rarely been labelled Venuses regardless, such as the Venus of Brassempouy.)

Interpretations of Venus figurines range from self-portraits to anti-climate-change charms to matriarchal representations of a mother goddess. Hayden argues the fertility charm interpretation is most parsimonious; Venus figurines are often found alongside other apparent fertility objects, such as phallic representations, and that secular interpretations in particular are implausible for such widespread objects. He similarly disagrees with the goddess symbolism, as seen in feminist anthropology, on the basis that contemporary hunter-gatherers who venerate female fertility often lack actual matriarchal structures. Indeed, in more recent hunter-gatherer societies, secret societies venerating female fertility are occasionally restricted to men. Contra the traditional fertility interpretation, Patricia C. Rice argues nonetheless that the Venuses are symbols of women throughout their lifetime, not just throughout reproduction, and that they represent a veneration of femaleness and femininity as a whole.

Sculpture, more broadly, is a significant part of Upper Paleolithic art and is often analysed for its spiritual implications. Upper Paleolithic sculpture is often viewed through the lens of sympathetic magic and ritual healing. Sculptures found in Siberia have been analysed through this understanding by comparison with more recent Siberian hunter-gatherers, who made figurines while ill to represent and ward off those illnesses. Venus figurines are not alone in terms of sexually explicit Paleolithic sculpture; around a hundred phallic representations are known, of which a significant proportion are circumcised, dating the origin of that practice to the era. Sculptures of animals are also recorded, as are sculptures that appear to be part-human and part-animal. The latter, especially, are deemed spiritually significant and possibly shamanistic in intent, representing the transformation of their subjects in the spirit realm. Other interpretations of therianthropic sculpture include ancestor figures, totems, and gods. Though fully human sculptures in the Upper Paleolithic are generally female, those with mixed human and animal traits are nearly universally male across broad geographic and chronological ranges.

Upper Paleolithic art
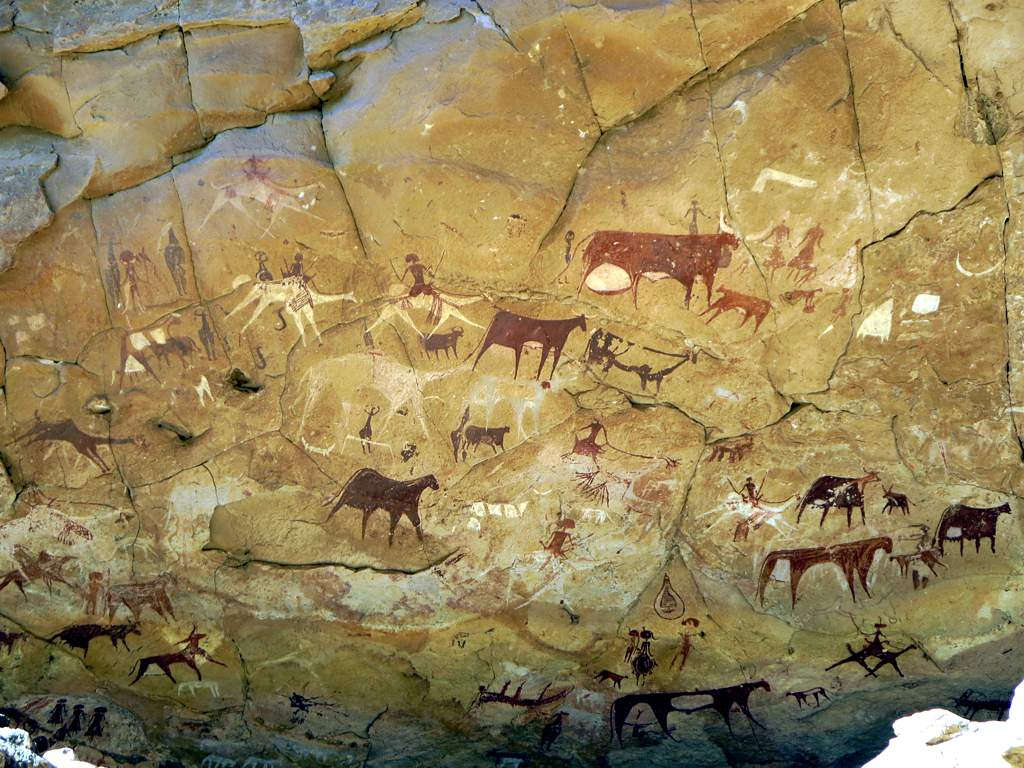
Cave art around the Ennedi Plateau

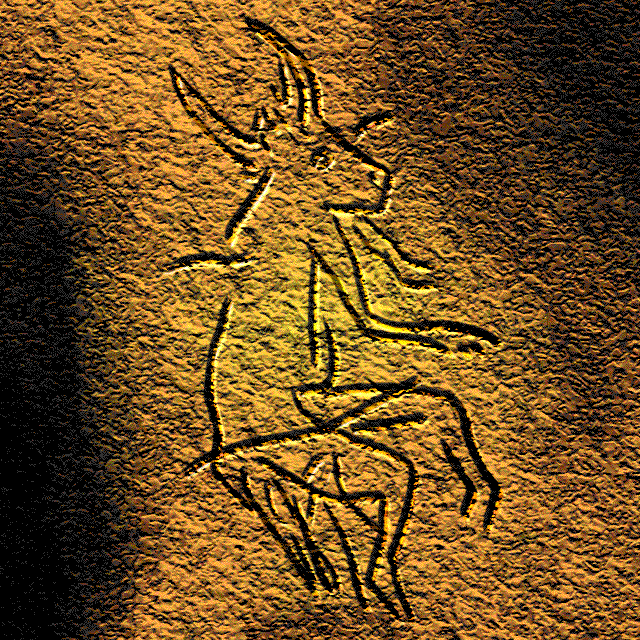
The Sorcerer of Grotte de Gabillou, an apparent animal-human hybrid

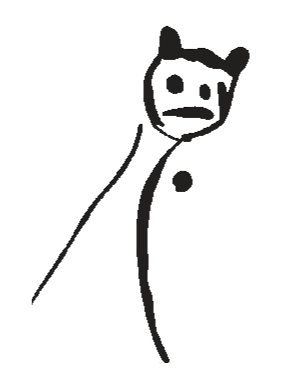
Possible depiction of a spotted hyena, Grotte de Gabillou

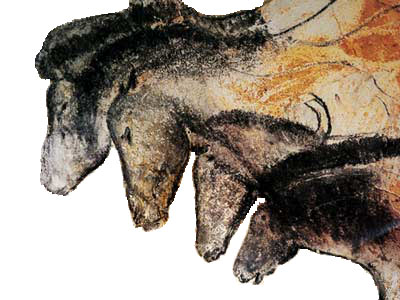
Horses of Chauvet Cave

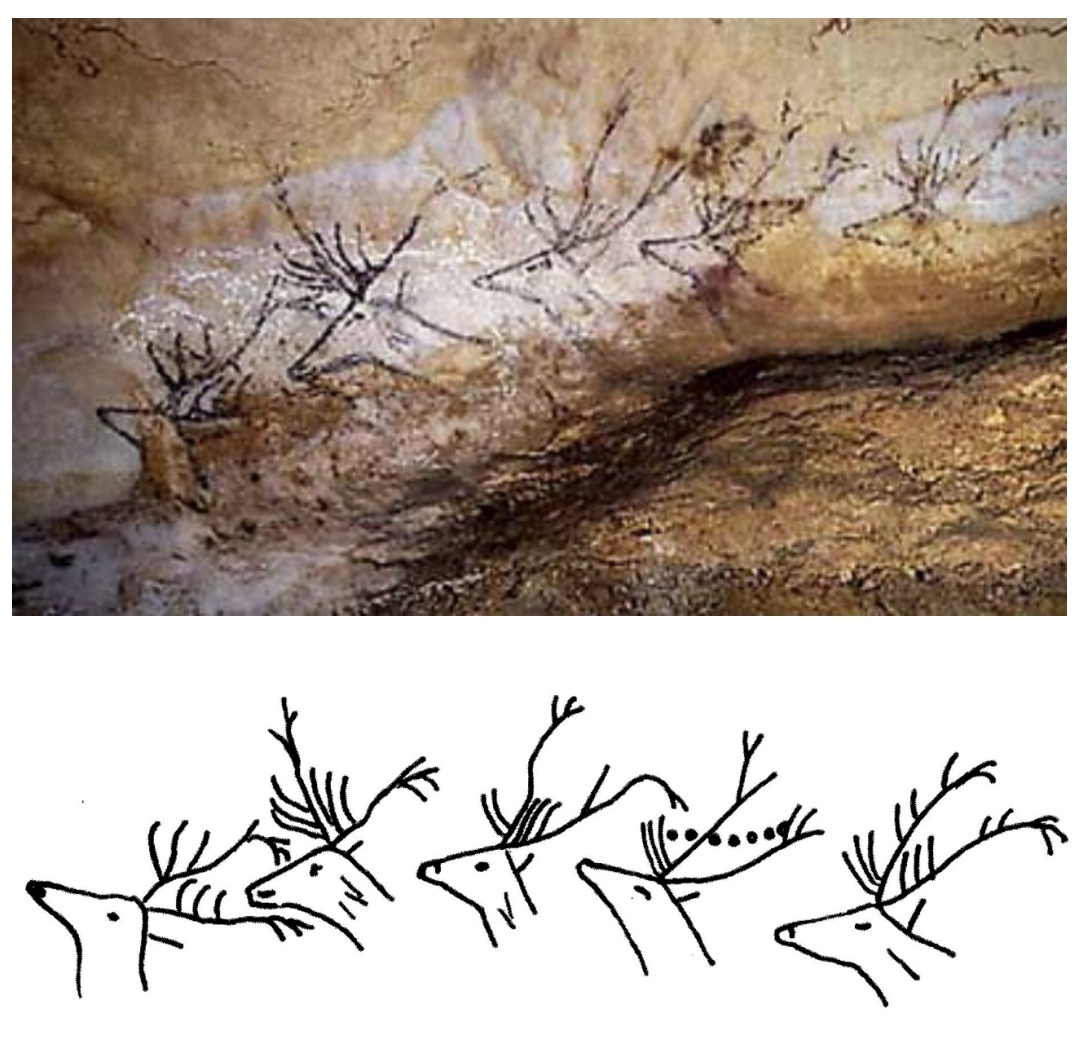
"Swimming Stags" of Lascaux

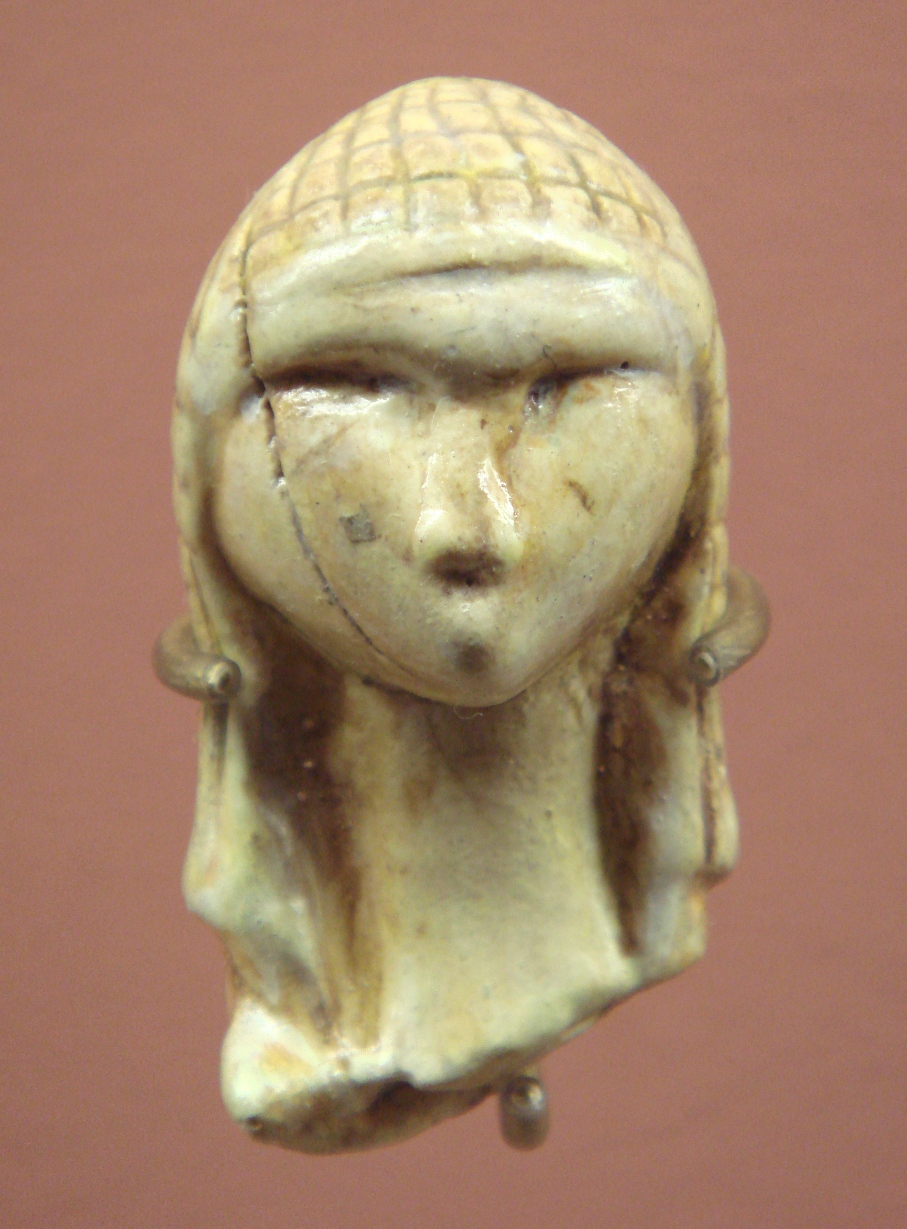
Venus of Brassempouy

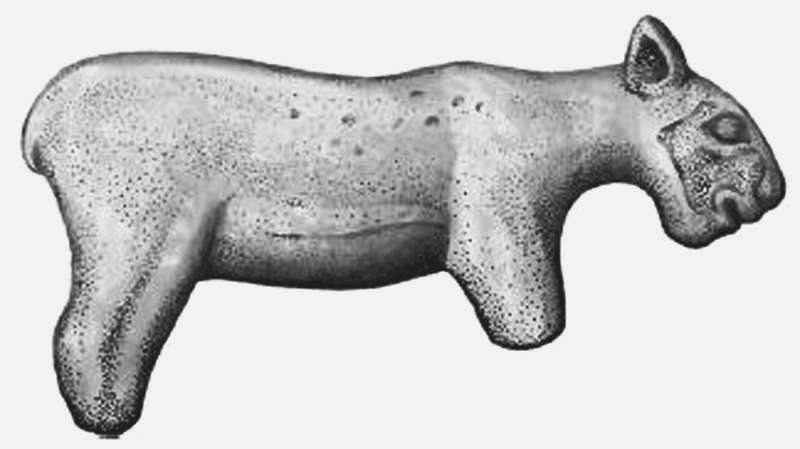
Felid statuette in Isturitz and Oxocelhaya caves

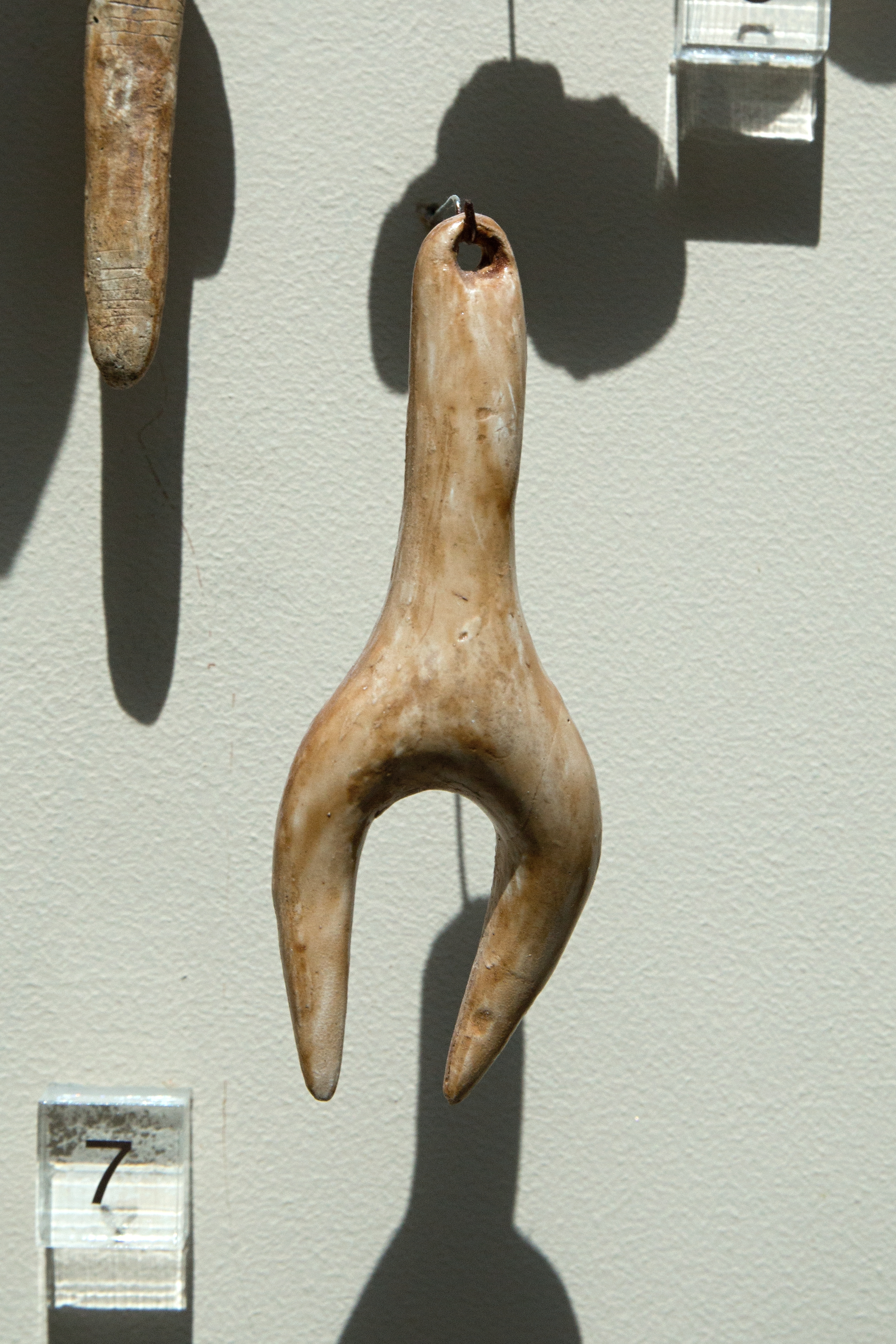
Stylised female figure pendant, Dolní Věstonice

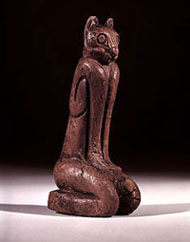
Key Marco Cat, Key Marco

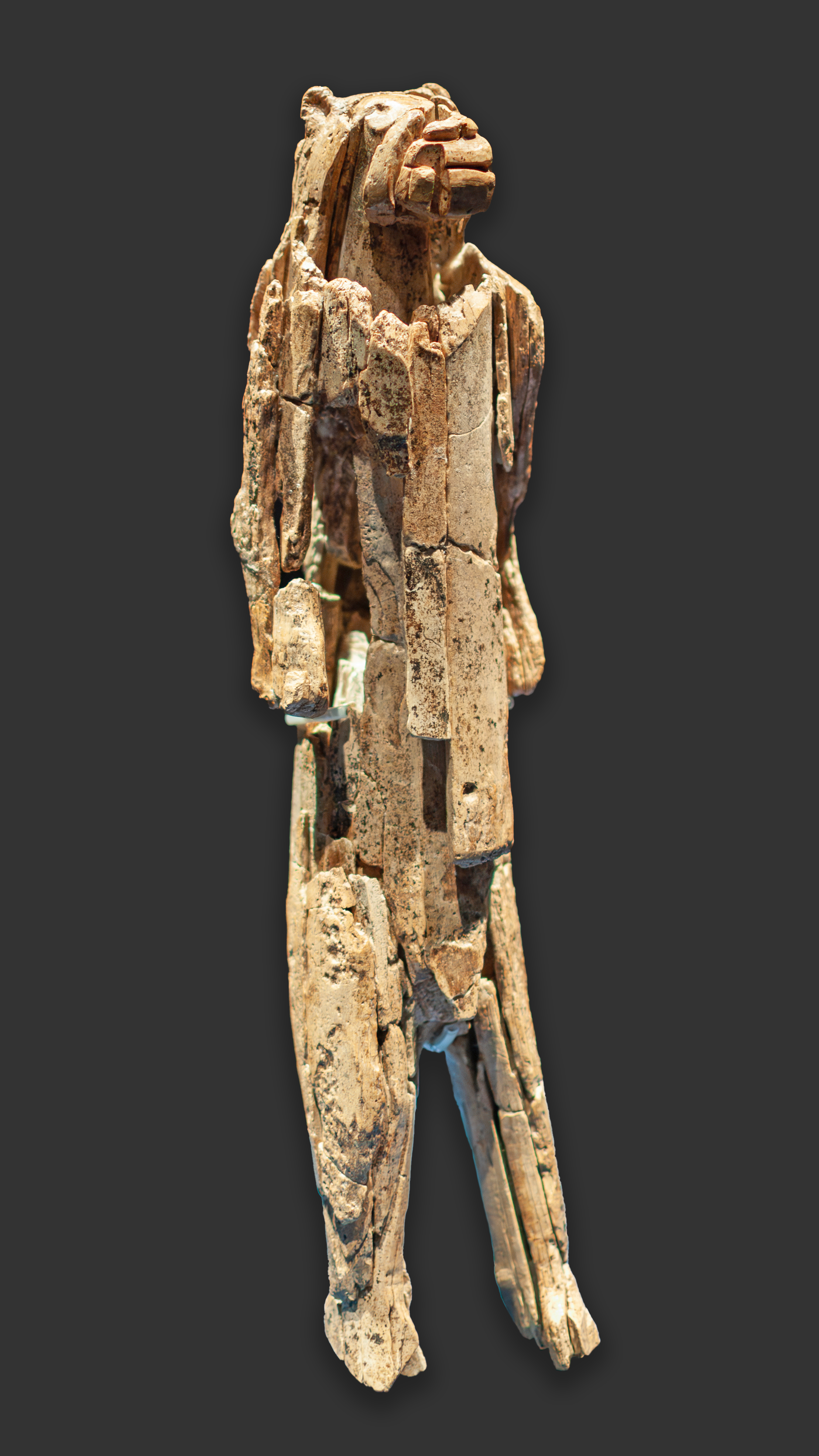
The Lion-man of Hohlenstein-Stadel, the first known animal-human hybrid figure

=== Burial ===
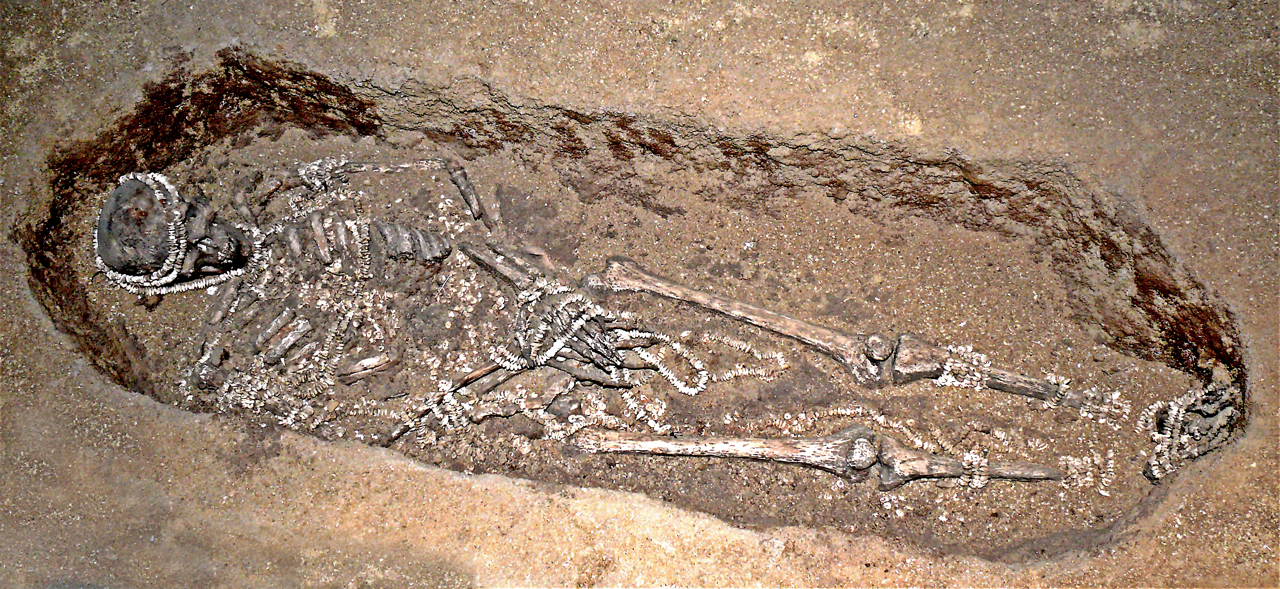
Man buried at Sungir in Russia, covered in ivory jewellery

The Upper Paleolithic saw the advent of complex burials with lavish grave goods. Burials seem to have been relatively uncommon in these societies, perhaps reserved for people of high social or religious status. Many of these burials seem to have been accompanied by large quantities of red ochre, but the matter of decomposition makes it difficult to discern whether such pigments were applied to flesh or bone. One remarkable case of a pigmented burial is that of Lake Mungo 3 in inland New South Wales, Australia; the ochre in which the body was found was likely transported for hundreds of kilometres, given the distance between the burial and the nearest sources.

One of the most elaborate Upper Paleolithic burials known is that of Sungir 1, a middle-aged man buried at the Russian Sungir site. In good physical health at the time of his death, Sungir 1 seems to have been killed by human weaponry, an incision on his remains matching that which contemporary stone blades would produce. The body was doused in ochre, particularly around the head and neck, and adorned with ivory bead jewellery of around 3,000 beads. Twelve fox canine teeth surrounded his forehead, while twenty-five arm bands made of mammoth ivory were worn on his arms, and a single pendant made of stone lay on his chest. Two children or young teenagers were additionally interred near him; their bodies were similarly decorated, with thousands of mammoth ivory beads, antlers, mammoth-shaped ivory carvings, and ochre-covered bones of other humans. The children had abnormal skeletons, with one having short bowed legs and the other an unusual facial structure. Burials so elaborate clearly suggest some concept of an afterlife and are similar to shaman burials in cultures described in written records.

Burial is one of the major ways archaeologists understand past societies; in the words of Timothy Taylor, "there can be no clearer a priori demonstration of ritual in past societies than the archaeological uncovery of a formal human burial". Upper Paleolithic burials do not appear to represent an ordinary cross-section of the population. Rather, their subjects are unusual and extravagant. Three-quarters of Upper Paleolithic burials were of men, a significant proportion of whom were young or disabled, and many were buried in shared tombs. They are frequently posed in unusual positions and buried with rich grave goods. Taylor supposes many of these dead were human sacrifices, excluded from the ordinary means of body disposal (he presumes cannibalism) and warded by talismans. Hayden rather speculates these were shamans or otherwise people whose religious prominence was in life, rather than death; he notes especially the frequency of physical disability, comparing it to the many shamans in recorded societies who were singled out for physical or psychological differences. (Note: Several writers have suggested that what is now understood as psychosis corresponds to ancient shamanism. Joseph Polimeni, professor of psychiatry at the University of Manitoba, contextualises the modern concept of schizophrenia as synonymous with shamanism, and as providing benefit, not harm, to those who had it in prehistoric societies. Some personal reports from people with psychotic experiences who have lived amongst hunter-gatherer societies where shamanism is still practiced suggest they found greater assistance and quality of life in those societies than elsewhere.)

=== Beliefs and practices ===
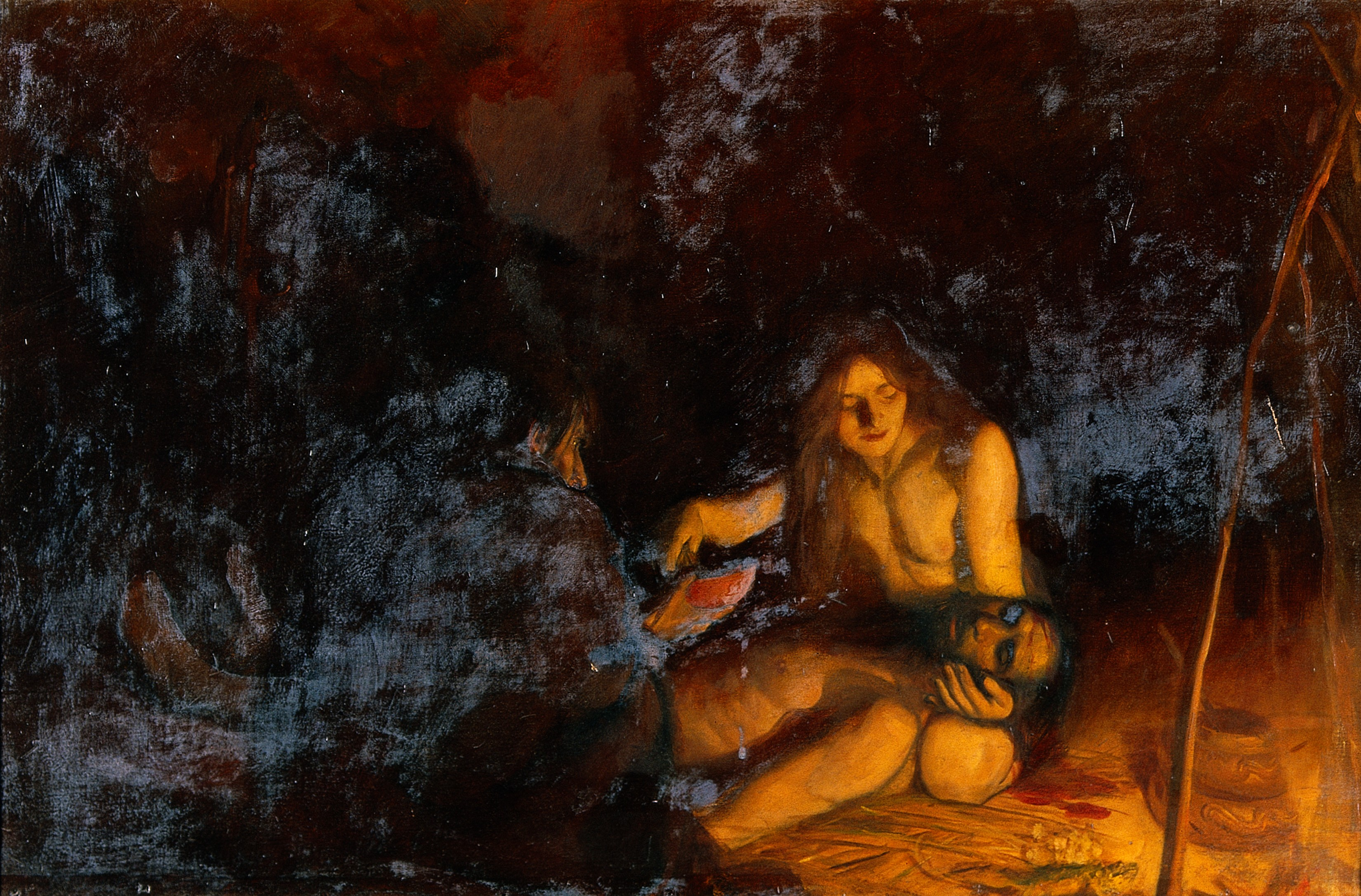
Ernest Board's impression of a Paleolithic healing ritual

Upper Paleolithic religions were presumably polytheist, venerating multiple deities, as this form of religion predates monotheism in recorded history. As well as polytheism, religions of the ancient world—that is, those in recorded history closest chronologically to prehistoric religion—focused on orthopraxy, or a focus on correct practice and ritual, rather than orthodoxy, or a focus on correct faith and belief. This is in contrast to many mainstream modern faiths, such as Christianity, that move the focus to orthodoxy.

Shamanism may have been a major part of Upper Paleolithic religion. Shamanism is a broad term referring to a range of spiritual experiences, practised at many times in many places. Broadly speaking, it refers to spiritual practice involving altered states of consciousness, in which practitioners enter ecstatic or extreme psychological states to commune with spirits or deities. The study of prehistoric shamanism is controversial—so controversial that people debating each side of the argument have dubbed their interlocutors "shamaniacs" and "shamanophobes". The shamanistic interpretation of prehistoric religion is based in the "neuropsychological model", where shamanic experience is deemed an inherent function of the human brain. The symbols associated with shamanic art, such as animal-human hybrid figures, are believed to originate from certain trance states. The neuropsychological model has been criticised; opponents refer to the relative rarity of some forms of art associated with it, to tendencies in modern shamanic cultures they find incompatible with it, and to the work of pre-model archaeologists who cautioned against shamanic interpretations.

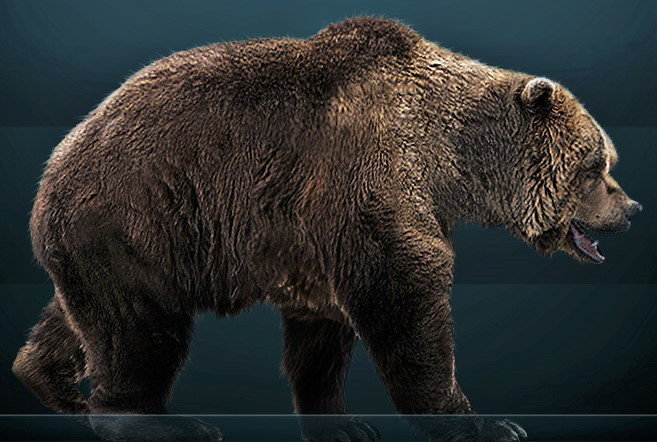
Reconstructed cave bear

A popular myth about prehistoric religion is bear worship. Early scholars of prehistory, finding the skeletons of the extinct cave bear in Paleolithic habitats, drew the conclusion that humans of the era worshipped or otherwise venerated the bears. The concept was pioneered by excavations in the late 1910s in Switzerland, where apparent deposits of cave bear bones, from which paleontologists could not infer a clear function, were interpreted ritualistically. The idea was debunked as early as the 1970s as a simple artefact of sedimentary deposits changing over thousands of years.

Another controversial hypothesis in Paleolithic faith is that it was oriented around goddess worship. Feminist analyses of prehistoricism interpret findings such as the Venus figurines as suggestive of fully realised goddesses. Marija Gimbutas argued that, as evidenced by Eurasian Venus figurines, the predominant deity in Paleolithic and Neolithic religion throughout Europe was a goddess, with later male deities serving as her subordinates. She supposed this religion was wiped out by steppe invaders later in the Neolithic, prior to the beginning of the historical period. The broad geographic range of Venuses has also seen their goddess interpretation in other regions; for instance, Bret Hinsch proposes a line of descent from Venuses to historical Chinese goddess worship. The goddess hypothesis has been criticised for basis in a limited geographical range, and for not mapping onto similar observations seen in modern hunter-gatherers.

=== Mesolithic ===
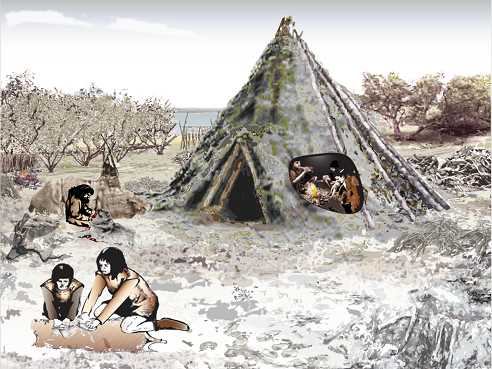
Artist's impression of Mesolithic daily life

The Mesolithic was the transitional period between the Paleolithic and the Neolithic. In European archaeology, it traditionally refers to hunter-gatherers living after the end of the Pleistocene ice age. (Note: Some writers claim evidence for Mesolithic agriculture or proto-agriculture, though this is outside the archaeological mainstream.) Traditional archaeology takes a quotidian view of Mesolithic life, perceiving it as an era of cultural "impoverishment" without great cultural, artistic, or societal advances. The lack of enthusiasm to study the Mesolithic, and the lack of encouragement to do so by way of an absence of interesting archaeological findings, tied into one another; for instance, no Mesolithic cemeteries were unearthed until 1975. Serious study of Mesolithic religion would not emerge until the 21st century, reinvigorating the field and reinterpreting prior assumptions of the Mesolithic as a bleak age.

Much research on Mesolithic religion centres on Scandinavia, where evidence has emerged of a lifecycle centred on rites of passage. From the finding of places that may have been dedicated birthing huts, it appears that Mesolithic people shared the assumption of some more modern hunter-gatherers that birth was a spiritually dangerous experience, and that heavily pregnant women needed to be secluded from society for the well-being of both parties. Nonetheless, the archaeological findings thought to be birthing huts are disputed; it is possible their spiritual significance was broader, as a place where people who died young were buried, separate from the older dead. Later in life, Anders Fischer argues for the existence of a coming-of-age ritual amongst males—perhaps circumcision—connected to the use of flint blades.

The bulk of modern understanding of Mesolithic religion comes from burial practices. Mesolithic Scandinavian burial rites are relatively well-reconstructed. The dead were buried with grave goods, notably including food; remnants of a fish stew have been unearthed from some graves. Burial practices themselves varied heavily. Bodies might be buried whole or partially dismembered before burial; in some cases, animals were found in graves alongside humans, such as deer, pigs, and cats. Bodies were often covered in ochre. The context of Mesolithic burial is unclear; though some have argued these burials were reserved for prestigious individuals, others think just the opposite, noting that dedicated cemeteries in the era overrepresent the very young, the very old, and young women who may have died in childbirth. These dead are traditionally considered more liminal than the average person, and their burials separate from the community may have marked an intentional distancing.

== Neolithic ==
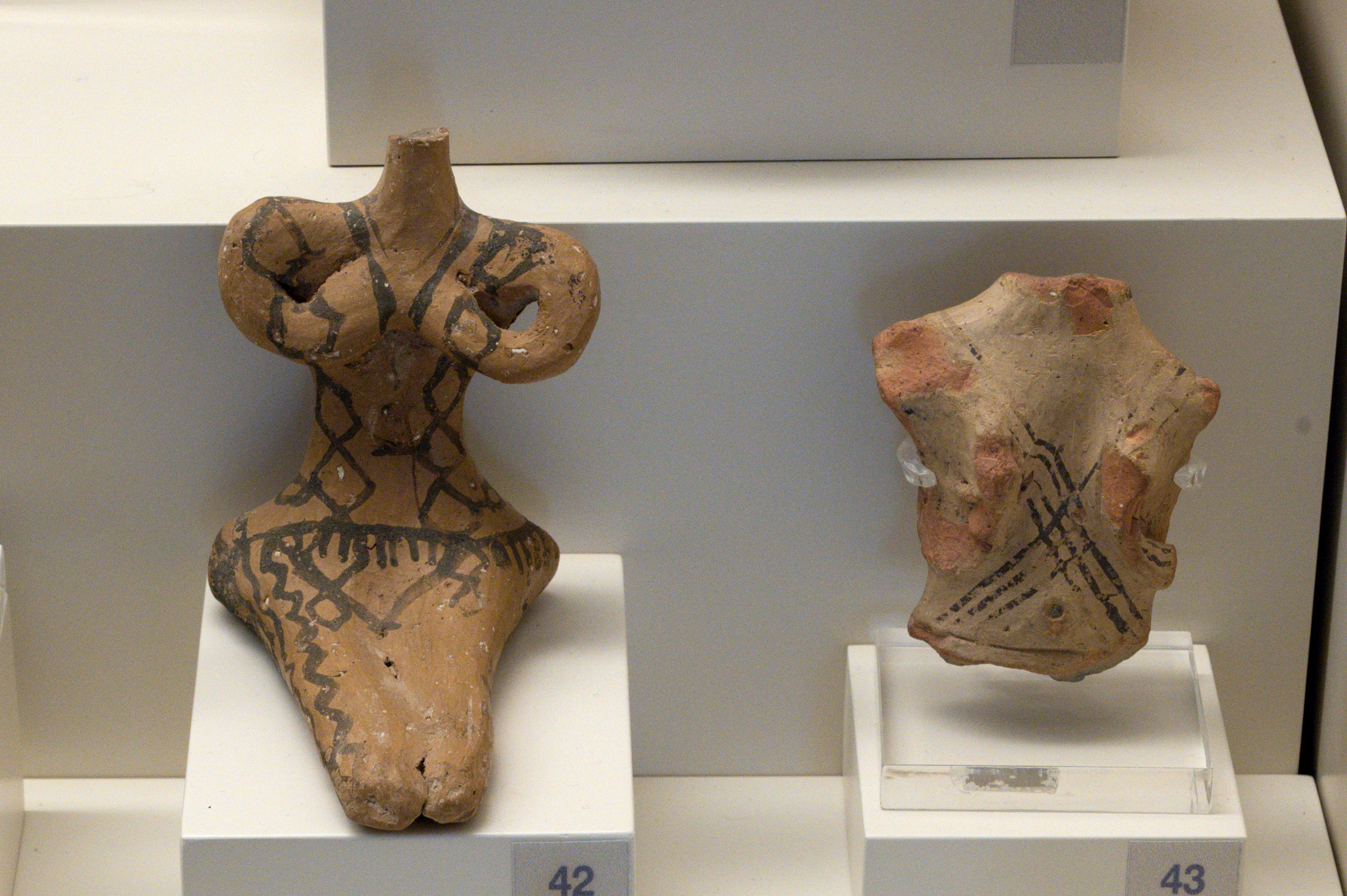
Neolithic figurines from the Franchthi Cave

The Neolithic was the dawn of agriculture. Originating around 10,000 BC in the Fertile Crescent, agriculture spread across Eurasia and North Africa over the following millennia, ushering in a new era of prehistory. Despite prior assumptions of immediate radical change, the encroachment of agriculture was a slow process, and early agriculturalists do not seem to have sharp cultural distinctions from their hunter-gatherer peers. In archaeological terms, the Neolithic is marked by megaliths, ceremonial structures, complex tombs, and elaborate artifacts with apparent spiritual significance. Sociologically speaking, the Neolithic saw the transition from nomadic bands to sedentary villages. This decreased the egalitarianism of those societies that transitioned; instead of more loosely collected confederates, they were now led by individuals with increasing power over those people within their domain. This "big man" framework centralised religion and elevated the status of religious leaders.

As the spectrum of human experience shifted from hunter-gatherers to farmers, so did ritual and religion. The ritual calendar of Neolithic life revolved around the harvest; the people of the age worshipped grain-oriented deities, prayed and sacrificed for good harvests, and threw celebrations in the harvest season. The Neolithic saw the emergence of a "spiritual aristocracy" of people whose societal role was as mages, missionaries, and monarchs. In the Neolithic, shamanism was increasingly understood as the domain of an elite, rather than the Paleolithic conceptualisation, in which a relatively broad spectrum of society could practice. The era broadly seems to have heralded the beginning of sharp social stratification, as understood from skeletal and archaeological remains.

=== Art, sculpture, and monuments ===
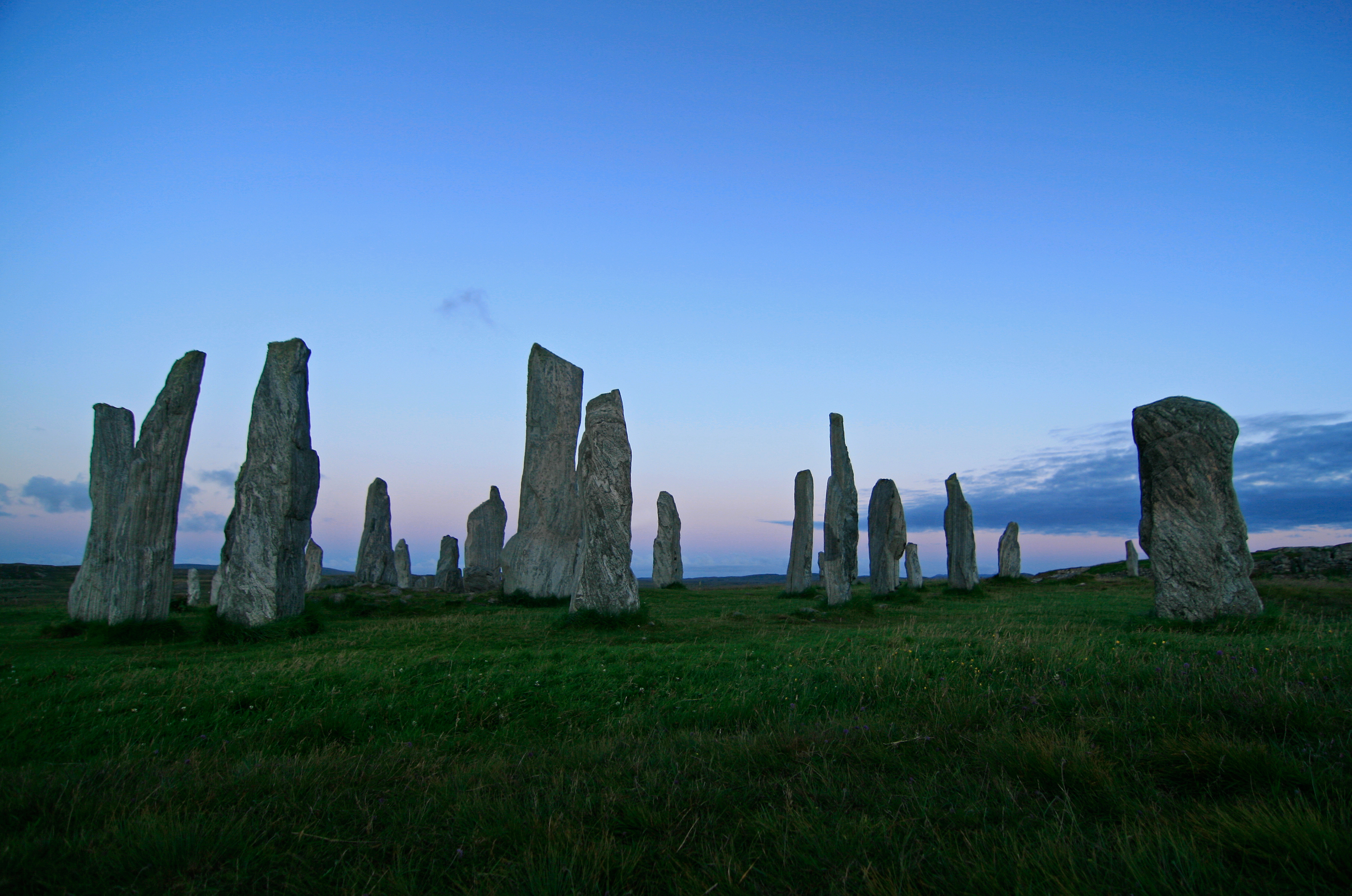
Callanish Stones of the Outer Hebrides, Scotland

Particularly in its heartland of the Near East, the Neolithic was an artistically and technologically rich era. The rock art culturally associated with the Paleolithic did not disappear in the Neolithic, and in regions like south India it indeed flourished well into the era. As well as continuing old forms, the Neolithic permitted the emergence of new kinds of art and design. As people moved from nomadic to sedentary lifestyles, they built houses that represented units united through physical structures, "subsum[ing] individuals into new corporate identities". They also built megaliths, huge stone monuments with widely speculated theological and cultural implications. Though a few hunter-gatherers, such as the Jōmon people of Japan, made pottery, pottery overall is another art form that emerged only in the Neolithic.

Neolithic art with apparent ritual significance occurs throughout broad geographic ranges. The Liangzhu culture of the southern Chinese Yangtze Delta produced complex and abundant jade artifacts, some of vast size for grave goods—up to 3.5 kilograms (7.7 lb). Many of these jades featured engravings of unusual creatures in complex finery. In Japan, the transition from Jōmon hunter-gatherers to Yayoi agriculturalists was marked by the production of Jōmon ceramic figurines apparently intended to ward away the Yayoi invaders; the Yayoi in turn carved intricate ornaments and built vast shrines. In Macedonia, clay models of human and ram heads represent apparent household ritual and suggest that ordinary houses could be host to religious activity just as much as shrines or temples.

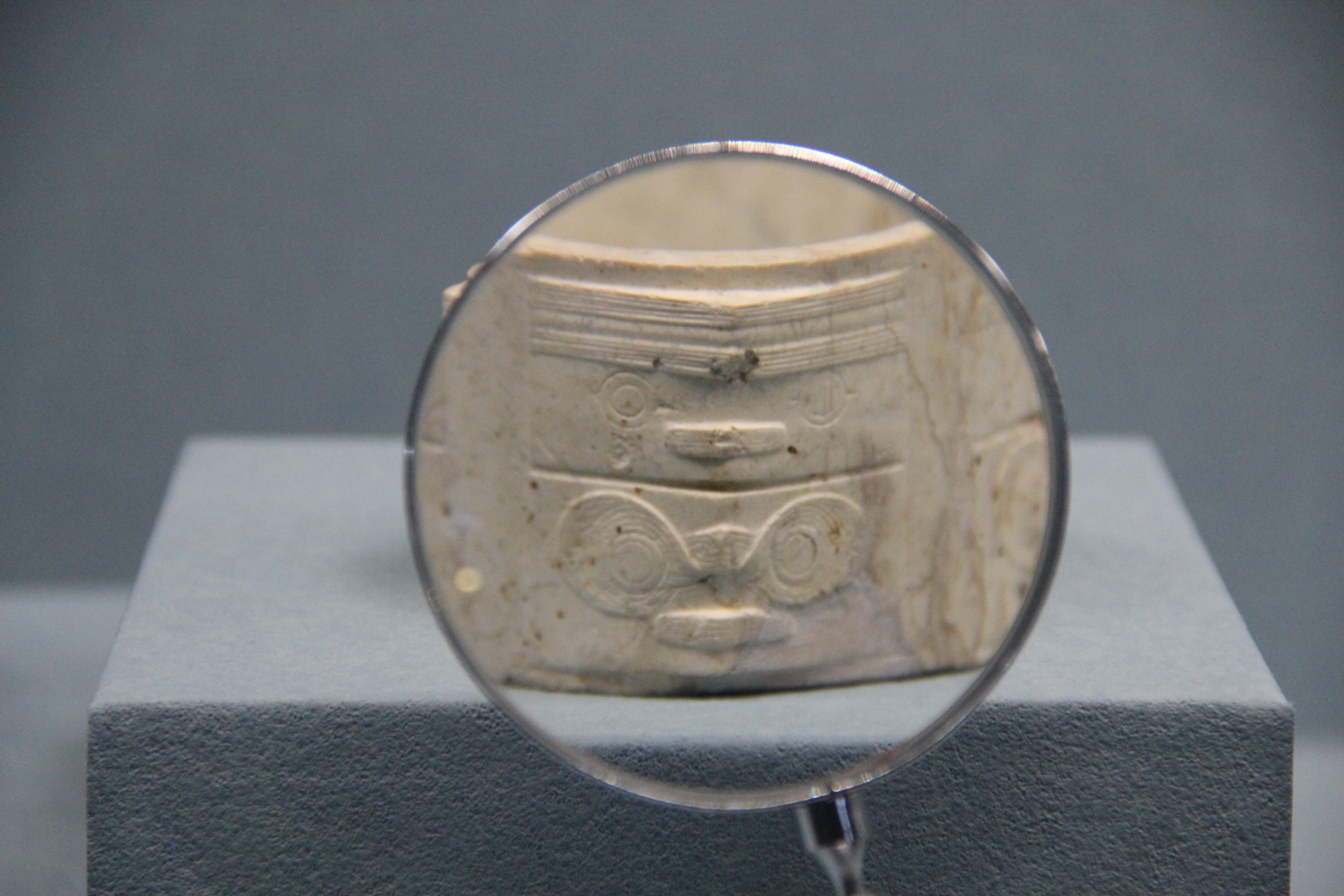
Liangzhu jade cong under magnification

One of the most famous forms of Neolithic art and architecture were the megalithic stone circles of Western Europe, of which the most known is Stonehenge in South West England. Stone circles are particularly associated with the British Isles, which hosts 1,303 extant circles, the plurality in Scotland. Stone circles were not simple constructions but built through complex processes where the stones travelled long distances to their foundations; parts of Stonehenge were sourced 250 kilometres (160 mi) away in Wales. This technically complex construction is thought to be a herald of their supernatural power to the people who built it; the Preseli Hills, where Stonehenge was sourced, may have held deep significance to the megalith's builders. Though the exact role of stone circles is unclear, they seem to have been, in part or whole, mausoleums. Many contain skeletons, particularly skulls. These seem to track to ancestor worship, and in particular the veneration of deceased members of elite spiritual social classes. Stone circles also appear linked to cycles of the sun and moon. Stonehenge, for instance, is aligned such that on the solstice the sun rises and sets directly behind it.

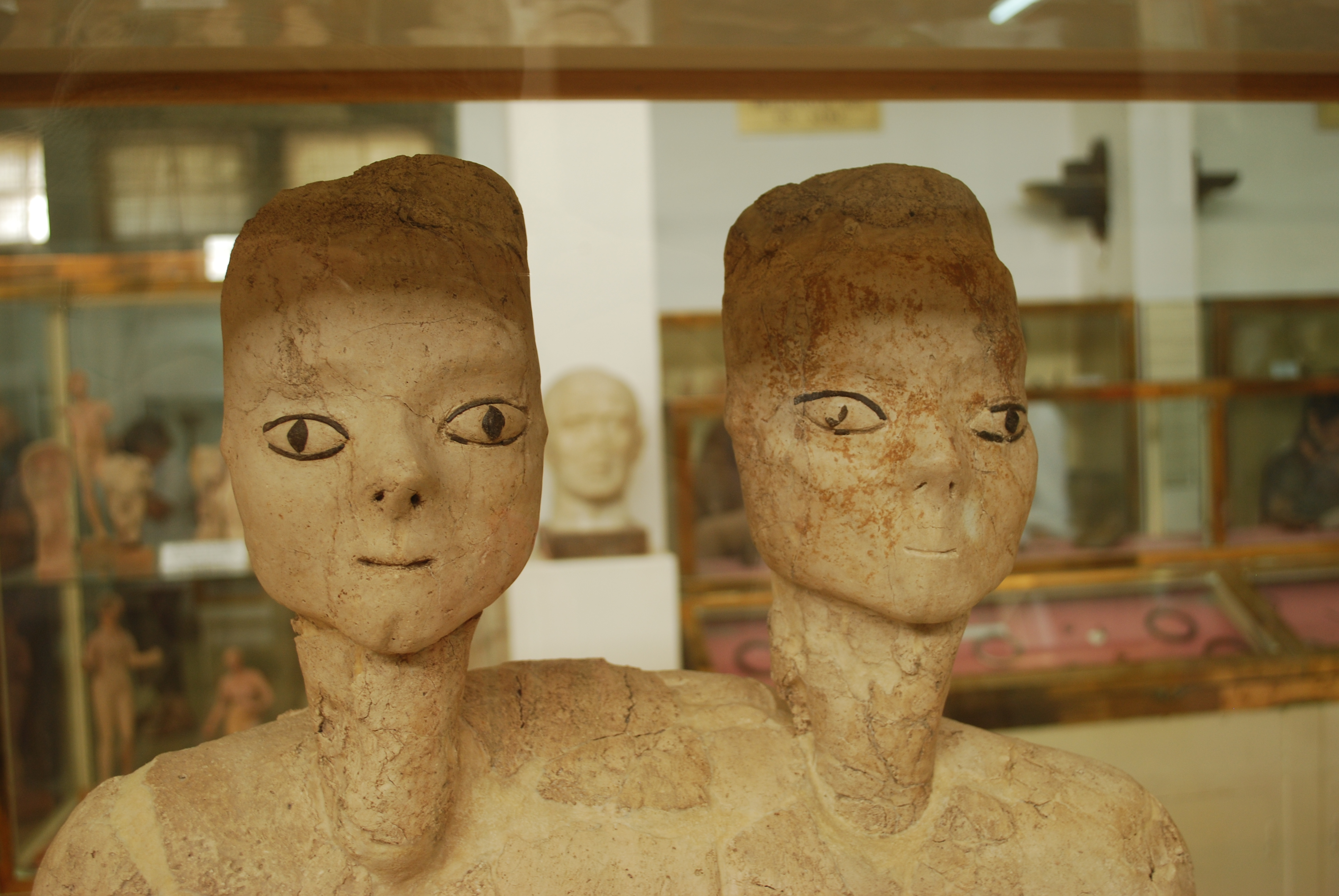
Two-headed Ayn Ghazal statue

Neolithic statues are another area of interest. The Ayn Ghazal statues unearthed in Jordan in the 1980s were an object of archaeological fascination. These statues may have represented gods, legendary leaders, or other figures of great power. The two-headed statues are of especial interest; Gary O. Rollefson suggests they may have represented the fusion of two previously separate communities. Elsewhere, statues have inspired varied theological interpretations. Maltese statues of women are, to some authors, suggestive of Neolithic goddess worship. The idea Neolithic peoples had a female-centric religion worshipping goddesses holds some purview in popular culture, but is disputed amongst anthropologists. In addition, though the goddess perspective of Neolithic religion oft assumes a female-centric religious practice, goddess-centric religions in comparable written societies may be dominated by men or women.

=== Burial and funerary rites ===
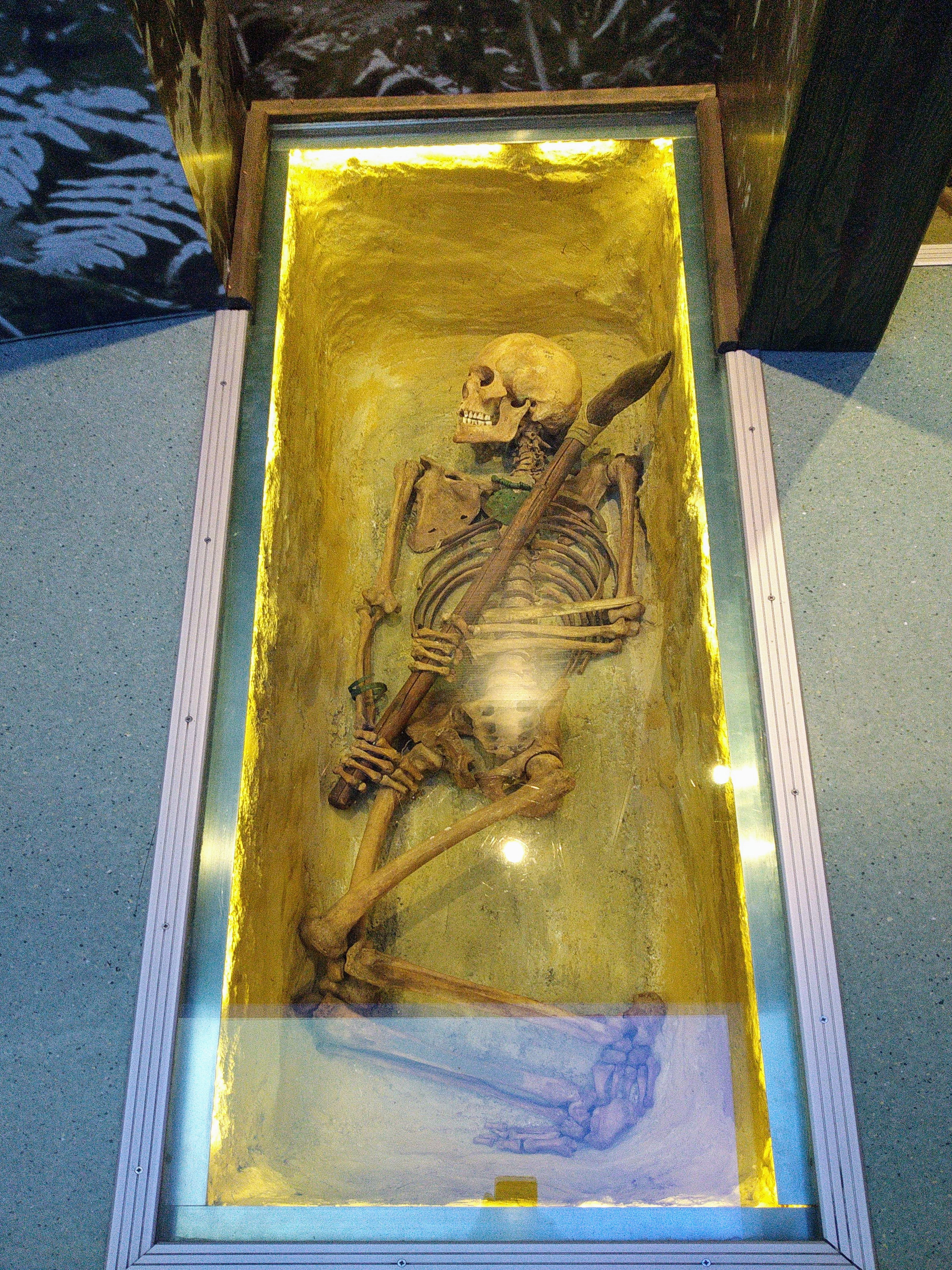
Neolithic burial at the Muzeum Archeologiczne i Etnograficzne w Łodzi

Burial appears to be more widespread in the Neolithic than in the Upper Paleolithic. In a wide area from the Levant through central Europe, Neolithic burials are frequently found in the houses their denizens lived in; in particular, women and children dominate amongst those buried inside the home. For children in particular, this may have represented the continued inclusion of these children in the family unit and a reincarnation cycle where those children were reborn as living members of the family. As in the Paleolithic, some Neolithic burials may represent sacrificial victims; a group burial in modern-day Henan, containing four skeletons, may have been the death of an important figure heralded by three sacrifices.

Neolithic burials display social inequality. At the Campo de Hockey necropolis in Spain, grave goods are unevenly distributed, and those found are often high-status ornamental objects such as jewellery. This is coterminous with the hypothesised Neolithic emergence of the "big men", societal figures who proclaimed themselves religious and earthly leaders of inegalitarian societies. In the most radical interpretations of Neolithic society, agriculture itself was a practice enforced upon people such that these rulers could acquire power over a more legible sedentary society. Across the Near East, burial inequality is marked in different ways by different societies. In the Lower Galilee, some dead were buried close to their houses, but others were buried in dedicated funerary monuments. Across the Levant, skeletons with the deceased's features modelled in plaster can be found; these individuals are thought to have had a different status in their societies than those buried without such preservation. In the Judaean Desert, decedents were found preserved in a "gelatinous material" and surrounded by blades, beads, and masks.

Sex and gender play roles in Neolithic burial. The Henan burial with potential sacrificial victims was composed of three men and one woman, and was read as a male shaman and his followers. Other Neolithic Chinese burials of people interpreted as shamans have been of girls and women, such as two girls found in elaborate tombs at a site in Shanxi—the only non-adults in that burial ground. Sarah Milledge Nelson wrote that burials of subjects of apparent religious importance were often clouded by a lack of clarity as to the subject's sex because of the difficulty of determining sex with certainty from skeletal remains; the focal decedent in "the richest of all Mesoamerican burials" was sexed male, but with low confidence, and could theoretically have been a woman. Neolithic burials broadly suggest gender inequality, with women having fewer grave goods and poorer diets as determined from their skeletons. (Note: It is unclear whether a paucity of grave goods in the female burial record represents a true lack of grave goods. Female grave goods may have been disproportionately made from materials rarely retained in the archaeological record, such as wood or textiles.)

=== Lifestyle ===
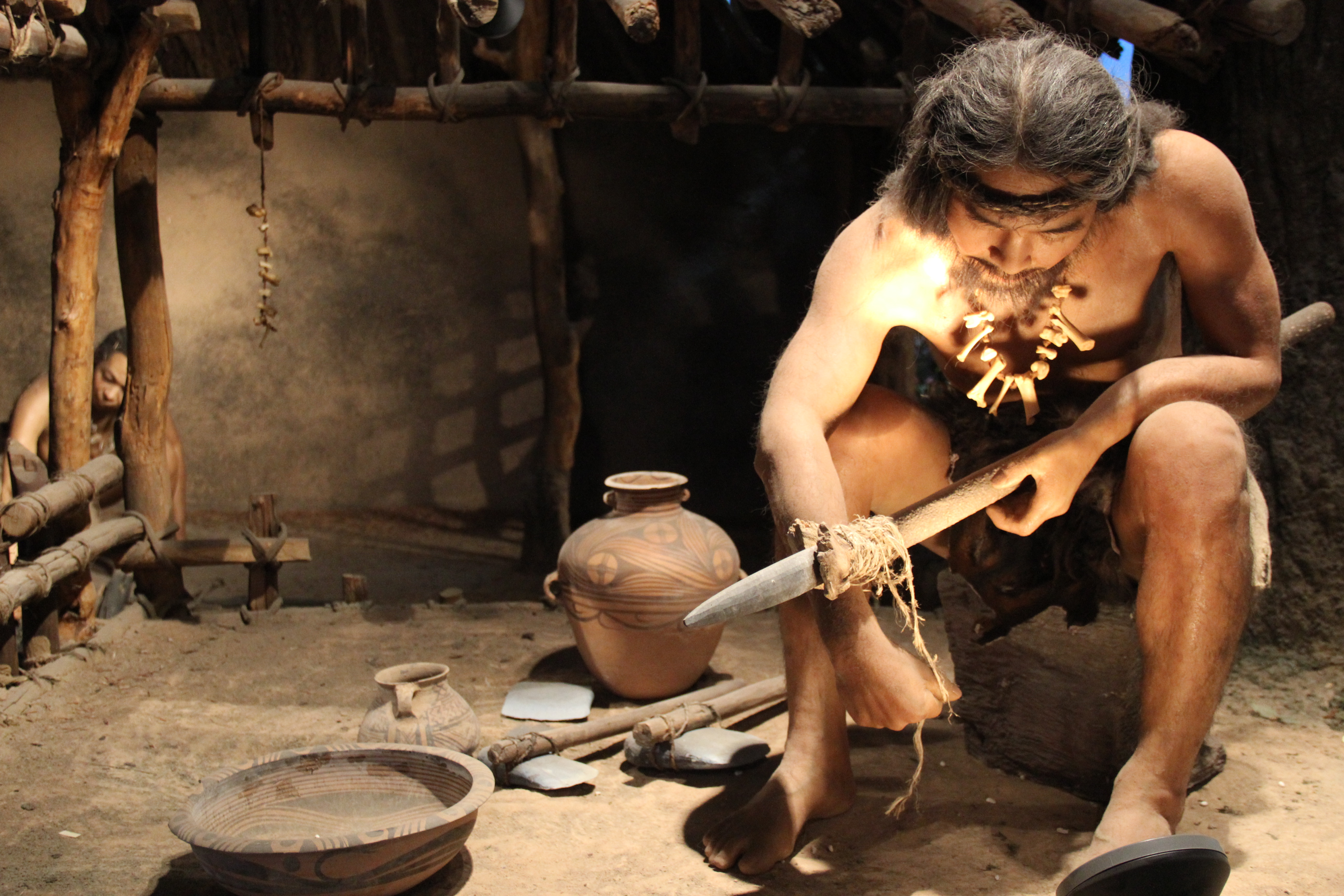
Diorama of pottery-making in Neolithic China

Much of what is understood about Neolithic life comes from individual settlements with particularly preserved archaeological records, such as Çatalhöyük in southern Anatolia. Çatalhöyük was settled for a long period, from around 7100 BC to 6000 BC, and provides a snapshot of a changing era. Residents of Çatalhöyük lived in shared houses with non-relatives, drawing their closest connections to "practical kin" rather than "official kin"; they seem to have been divided into two sub-communities, going by different dental patterns in their skeletal remains, and were possibly patrilocal, with men staying in the community of their birth and women moving away. Nonetheless, Çatalhöyük is not representative of all Neolithic communities; most such communities demonstrated poor nutrition and stunted growth, whereas the people of Çatalhöyük appeared to have adequate nutrition and were able to support substantial population growth.

From these preserved settlements, archaeologists try to extract religious practices in day-to-day Neolithic life. In 'Ain Ghazal, "mundane archaeological remains" coincide with striking findings such as caches of skulls, ceremonially buried statues, and hundreds of clay figurines. Many of these figurines seem to have been fertility and birth charms; birth during the Neolithic was "the most dangerous time of a woman's life", and spiritual protection against maternal death of the utmost importance. Other figurines seem to have been used as pseudo-sacrifices, ritually 'killed' and buried around human habitations. Clay figurines broadly have been found in many Neolithic communities, and the individual communities that made them are extrapolated based on their features. Sites in North China, for instance, find a paucity of figurines of humans compared to those of animals, while their southern peers made more human figurines and particularly sexually explicit ones. It is often unclear exactly what role such figurines held to the societies that made them; in addition to religious objects, they may have held more mundane functions such as toys, or even been both at once.

The theological practices of people in early state societies with written records, somewhat later than the Neolithic, revolved around their daily lives. In particular, these societies focused on the cultivation and harvest of grains, and their religions followed suit; they worshipped grain gods and had liturgical calendars revolving around the harvest. Early agricultural societies also suffered high rates of zoonotic diseases, which they opposed with ritual practice, sympathetic magic, and prayers to healing deities. Like other prehistoric-like societies described in written records, these experiences may be comparable to those of Neolithic agriculturalists.

=== Ritual and theology ===
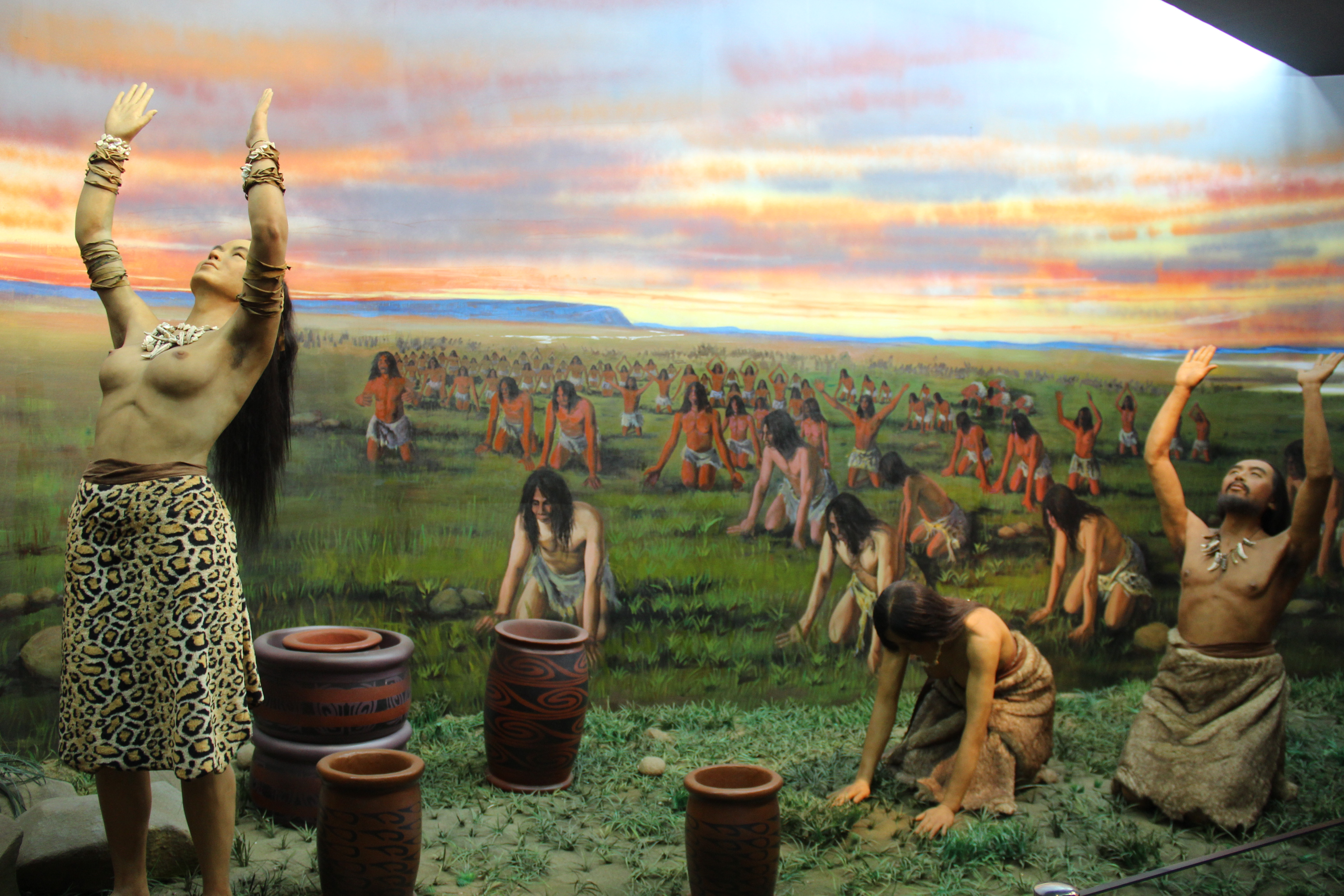
Possible representation of Neolithic religious practice

People in the Neolithic possibly engaged in ancestor worship. It is possible that inegalitarian Neolithic societies practised two separate ancestor cults: one based on the everyday worship of ancestors of individual families, and one based on ancestors of entire tribes, settlements, or cities, which the rulers of those people deemed themselves descended from. In bids to gain spiritual and earthly power, these rulers would posit themselves as the heirs of the gods. In some regions, evidence also exists for solar worship and lunar worship; for instance, British and Irish stone circles are generally aligned with the movement of the sun, which plausibly played a role in their ritual significance.

Neolithic religions were probably heavily ritual-based. These rituals would have signalled membership of and investment in the communities of those who performed them; these communities had labour- and health-expensive initiation rituals (consider the penile subincision performed by some Indigenous Australians), and practising them marked people as members of a given community - both to the community's allies and to its enemies - even if they were later to try to strike out on their own. This preserved the health of such communities; their members developed a deep identity as members, as people whose fortunes were tied to the broader community, and preferred to stay rather than split.

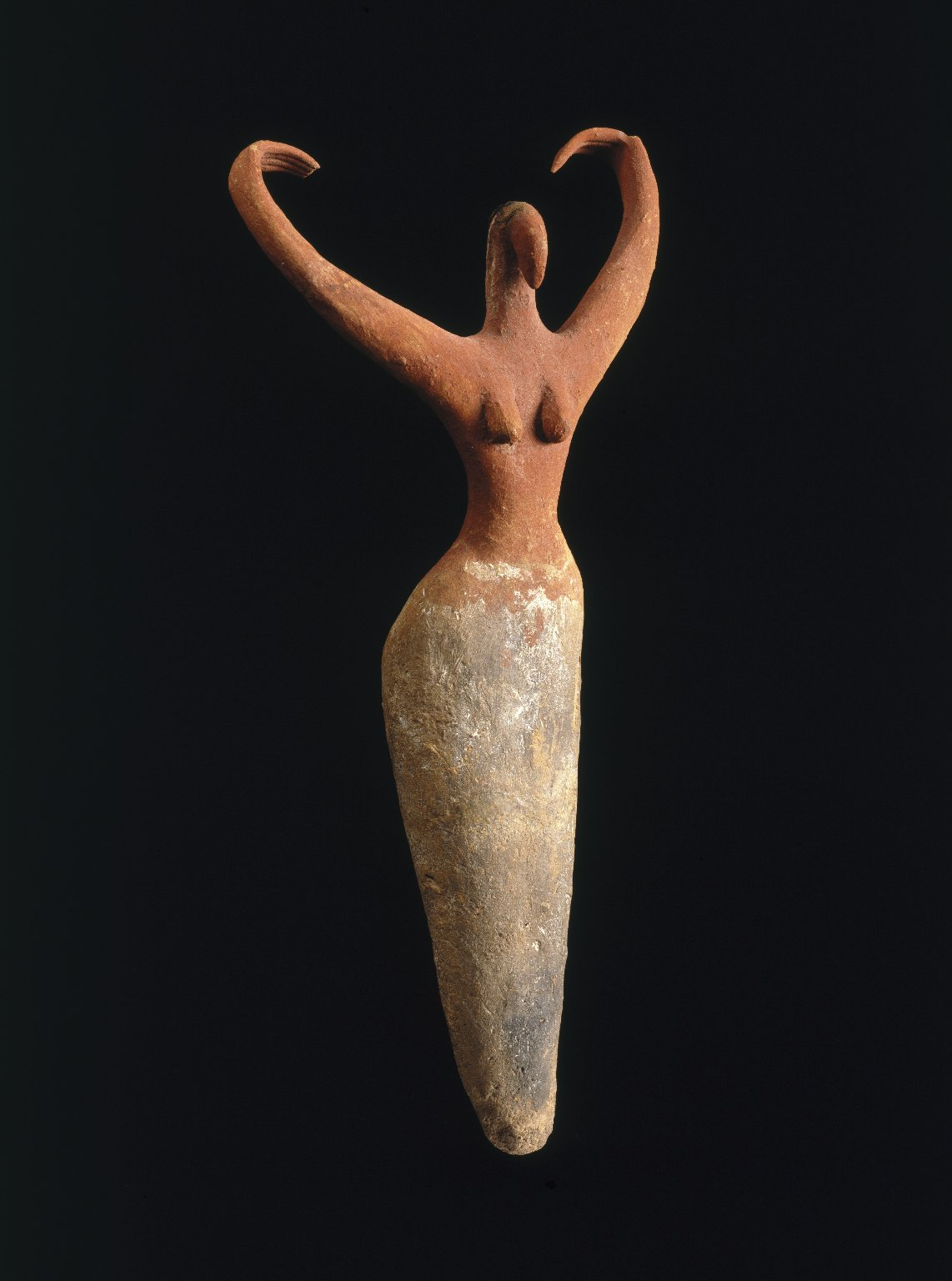
Predynastic Egyptian statuette of the goddess Bat

One idea associated with Neolithic religion in popular culture is that of goddess worship. Some, fancifully, have promoted an idealised image of Neolithic society as a matriarchal theocracy. At Çatalhöyük, traditionally considered a centre of goddess worship on account of figurines found in the area, followers of new religious movements would take pilgrimages to the ruins as a holy site; the sociologist Ayfer Bartu Candan reported seeing a woman eat a handful of soil from the ruins in front of the mayor of the nearby town of Çumra. The popularity of the "Great Goddess" concept of Neolithic religion can be traced to Gimbutas's concept of a peaceful matriarchal Neolithic, where a goddess was worshipped in a pan-European religion; the roots of the concept emerged as early as the 1940s and 1950s, with seminal works by Robert Graves, Jacquetta Hawkes, and O. G. S. Crawford pioneering the concept. However, the idea was based on flawed methodologies and conflation of different movements across vast geographical areas, and is unlikely to be representative of actual Neolithic religious practice.

In the specific case of Çatalhöyük, the primary objects of worship do not seem to have been human deities but rather animal ones, and the figurines traditionally interpreted as "goddesses" may have been anthropomorphic representations of bears, leopards, and cattle. This seems to be reflective of a broad Neolithic tendency towards animal worship; the nearby site of Göbekli Tepe also bears significant evidence for the ritual and religious significance of animals. The Xinglongwa and Hongshan cultures of northeastern China carved elaborate jade sculptures of pigs and dragons speculated to have some religious role; China was one of the first major sites of animal domestication, and domestic animals seem to have played wide-ranging roles in Neolithic Chinese ritual practice, in particular as sacrificial goods for high-ranking spiritual leaders.

Compared to the Paleolithic, shamanism seems to have become more peripheral during the Neolithic. In many regions, priests of increasingly centralised faiths probably took over isolated shamanic functions, although shamanism and domestic cults of personal deities clearly continued. Meanwhile, in the highly stratified societies of the Neolithic, elite secret societies flourished amongst the powerful. In these unequal worlds, the spiritually powerful were able to manipulate faith to convince the general population of their social and spiritual subordinacy.

=== Chalcolithic ===
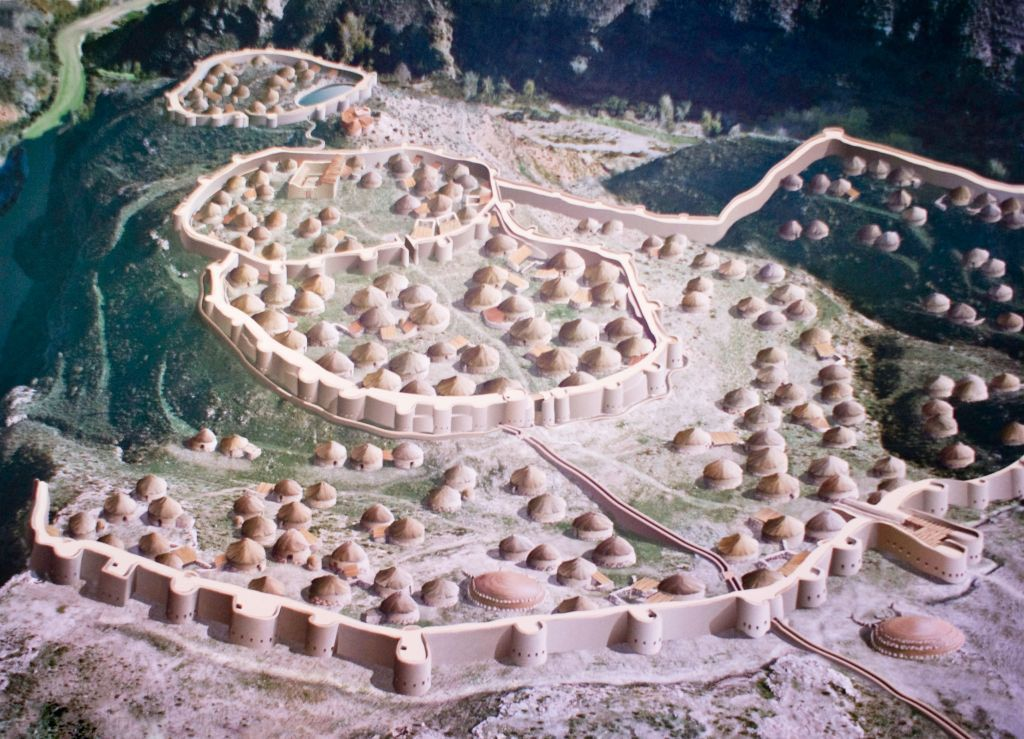
Artist's impression of the Los Millares Copper Age settlement in Spain

The Chalcolithic, or Copper Age, (Note: The era is variably known as the Chalcolithic, Eneolithic, or Copper Age by geography, and sometimes by precise chronology. Eneolithic has been characterised as "unfortunate aesthetically" on account of its combination of Latin and Greek roots, while both it and Chalcolithic have been criticised for etymological ambiguity, on account of both aeneus and chalkos being ambiguous between copper and bronze.) was the transitional period between the Neolithic and Bronze Age. In the Copper Age, an early understanding of metallurgy enabled the production of simple copper tools to supplement stone tools, but not the deliberate production of its improved alloy, bronze. In the Levant, the Copper Age is typified by social, agricultural, and artistic innovation. Horticulture of plants such as olives became a major complement to grain agriculture, while the animal products available to farmers diversified. Settlements expanded and came to inhabit broader geographical ranges, while the art and textiles of the area made great strides in both ornamental capacities and symbolic representation. This contrasts with their peers in Egypt and Mesopotamia, who remained somewhat more inhibited throughout the era. Further west and especially north, the concept of the Copper Age grows controversial; the "British Chalcolithic" is particularly unclear, with both support and opposition for the idea that copper metallurgy heralded a particular era in British prehistory.

==== Proto-Indo-Europeans ====
One of the major hypothesised cultures of the Copper Age was the Proto-Indo-Europeans, from whom all Indo-European language and mythology may have evolved. The Proto-Indo-Europeans are speculatively known through the reconstructed Proto-Indo-European language, which bears traces of religion; *Dyḗws, the reconstructed Proto-Indo-European sky god, developed into, for instance, the Greek Zeus and all he begat. *Dyḗws was the presumed leader of a pantheon of deities including *Dhuĝhatḗr Diwós ("sky daughter"), *Hₐéusōs ("dawn goddess"), *Neptonos ("water grandson"), and *Perkʷunos ("thunder god"). There was also *Manu-, humanity's ancestor, who became Mannus of Germanic paganism and similar to Manu of early Hinduism. There has been some reconstruction of the Proto-Indo-European afterlife, "a land of green pastures, where age and sickness are unknown", accessible only via dangerous travels through a watery, hound-guarded maelstrom.

Proto-Indo-European religion is understood through the reconstruction of shared elements of ancient faith across the regions influenced by the Proto-Indo-Europeans. For instance, shared portions of the Odyssey and the Mahābhārata permit reconstruction of a "proto-epic" from which both tales descend. From this scholars infer "a rich mythology of which only distant echoes have come to us" with substantial gaps in the pantheon, particularly with more speculative deities such as a possible war god. Indo-Europeanists J. P. Mallory and Douglas Q. Adams are skeptical about the Proto-Indo-European war god, though Hayden (writing from a more generalist perspective) supposes its existence, possibly represented as a bull. Hayden also argues for entheogenic rites amongst the Proto-Indo-Europeans, particularly a psychoactive "drink of immortality" backformed from the Indo-Iranian soma and madhu (Note: Though madhu is an Indo-Aryan term, Hayden refers to it as Irish, perhaps by confusion with mead (which derives from the same root).) and the Greek ambrosia, which was imbibed by Proto-Indo-European priests.

== Bronze and Iron Ages ==
In the Bronze and Iron Ages, prehistory shades into protohistory. The earliest forms of true writing emerge in Bronze Age China, Egypt, and Mesopotamia, and it is with writing that societies leave their prehistories. Writing was adopted unevenly, across long chronological periods, and the degree to which the Bronze and Iron Ages constitute history, prehistory, or protohistory depends on the individual society. Protohistoric societies have not developed writing, but have been described in written records of societies that have; though this provides more evidence for their cultures and practices than can be gleaned by archaeological records alone, it poses the problem that the only lens these societies are understood through is that of foreigners who may dislike, mischaracterise, or simply misunderstand the people they write about.

In North Africa, many protohistoric Bronze Age civilisations are known from description by the Egyptians, such as the Kerma culture of what is now Sudan, the Maghrebinians, and the Kingdom of Punt. Before their destruction by their Egyptian enemies, the Kerma served as a true artistic and cultural rival to Egypt's south. They performed lavish burials with a traditional "crouching" style of body placement, the bodies buried on their right sides with their heads facing to the east, and with rich assortments of grave goods. Earlier Kerma burials were accompanied by animal sacrifices, and later by human ones, presumably of servants. The richest members of Kerma society were buried in gold-plated beds with feet of carved lions and hippopotami, in many-chambered burial mounds accompanied by hundreds of human sacrifices and paintings of spectacular imagined scenes.

The people of the Bronze Age Maghreb, living in liminal geographic regions, were heavily influenced by both European and Khoisan cultures. Maghrebinians appear to have venerated weaponry, with intricate depictions of daggers, halberds, and shields dominating their rock art, perhaps as the southernmost practice of a hypothetical pan-European weapon cult. They also produced art of game animals such as antelopes, horses, and camels. Little is known about the religion of Punt, Egypt's major trading partner, but they seem to have had significant cultural exchange with Egypt in this aspect. Other major cultures of Bronze Age Africa whose religious practices can be gathered include the nomadic pastoralists of the Central Sahara, who produced copious rock art, and the Nubian C-Group culture, with wealthy burials and rock art of "highest artistic achievement" depicting apparent goddess figures.

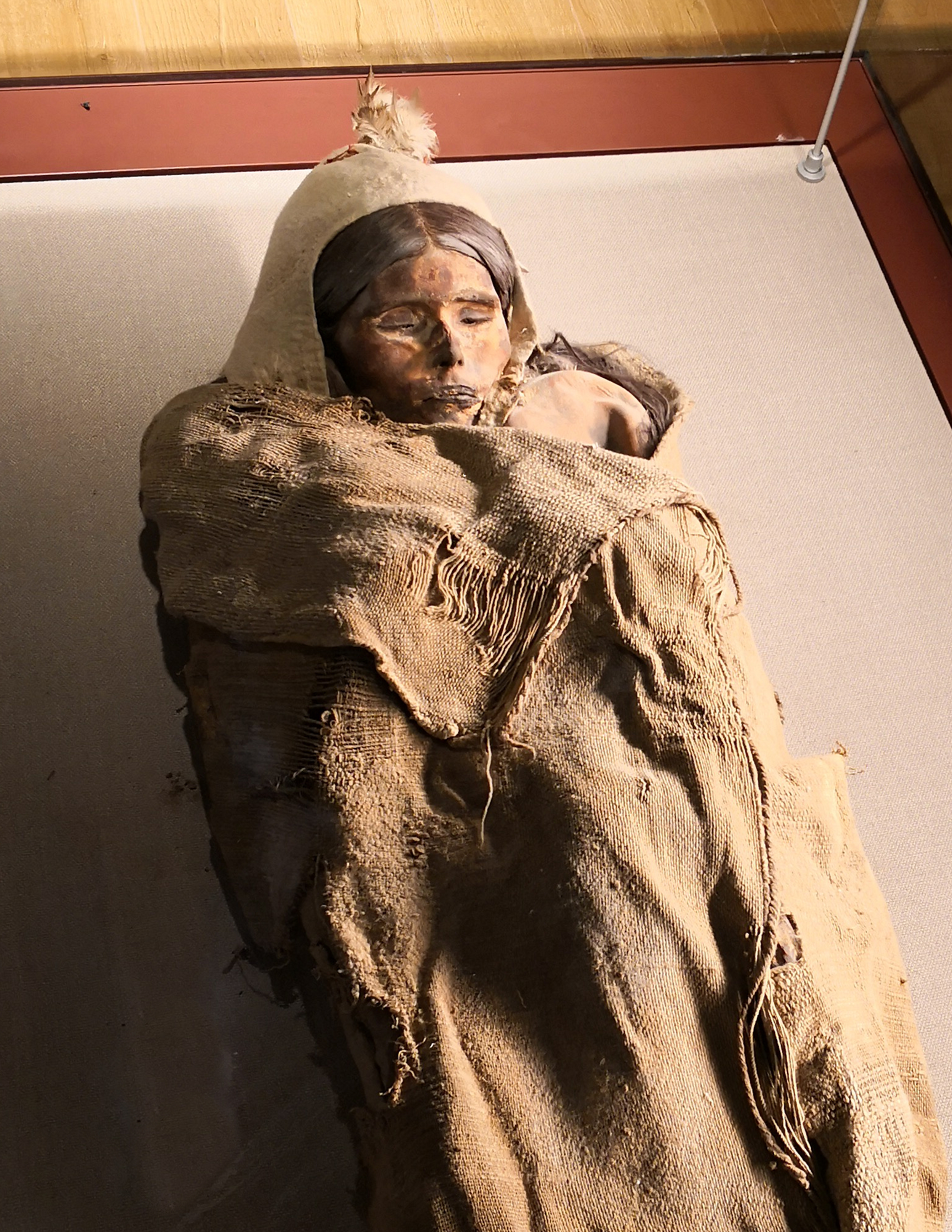
Beauty of Loulan, one of the Xinjiang mummies

The protohistoric cultures of Central Asia are known through their descriptions by ancient Chinese writers, who thought them barbarians contrasting with "civilised" Chinese society; further west, Russian scholarship more often treats these cultures as outright prehistoric. Bronze and Iron Age cultures of Central Asia forged metal grave goods with both utilitarian and decorative forms. Though the spiritual significance of these artifacts is unknown, archaeologists Katheryn M. Linduff and Yan Sun argue they must have been deeply important to those societies that forged them to play such funerary roles. Xinjiang was a major nexus of cross-cultural interaction in these eras, and is now known archaeologically for its "mummies", (Note: These were not actual mummies in the intentional sense, but rather corpses naturally preserved by desiccation.) particularly well-preserved corpses found in burials—perhaps the most famous being the Princess of Xiaohe. This young woman, buried in Xiaohe Cemetery around 1800 BC, was so well-preserved as to retain her long hair and eyelashes; she was found wrapped in a cloak and accompanied by wooden pegs. Other "mummies" of Xinjiang include artificial mummies, not corpses at all but creations of leather and wood, which may represent people who died far from their homes whose bodies were never found.

In Southeast Asia, Bronze Age burials were of far greater complexity than those for their Neolithic predecessors. One burial site in Ban Non Wat, Thailand dating around 1000 BC was lavished with "princely" wealth, with ornate jewellery of bronze, marble, and seashells; in some cases, bracelets covered the whole arm from the shoulder to the wrist. Bodies were found covered in beads in ways implying those beads once served as sequins on masks and hats that rotted away with time. Finely made, intricately painted ceramic vessels were buried with the deceased, in some cases up to fifty in a single grave. In one case, an infant was buried with a particularly well-made vessel bearing a human face, which Charles Higham suggests may represent an ancestor deity. Higham perceives strong evidence for ancestor worship in Bronze Age Southeast Asia, perhaps related to contemporary practice in China. Later in the Iron Age, Southeast Asian societies become trading and cultural partners with the ancient civilisations of China and India. Cambodia and Thailand connected strong trading networks with both regions, becoming protohistoric as they merited discussion in the works of both written societies. Though the burial record for Iron Age Southeast Asia is poorer than in the Bronze Age, lavish burials still happened, and "compelling evidence" for religious practice remains. Vietnamese merchants traded Ngoc Lu drums used for ritual purposes to regions as far-flung as Papua New Guinea.

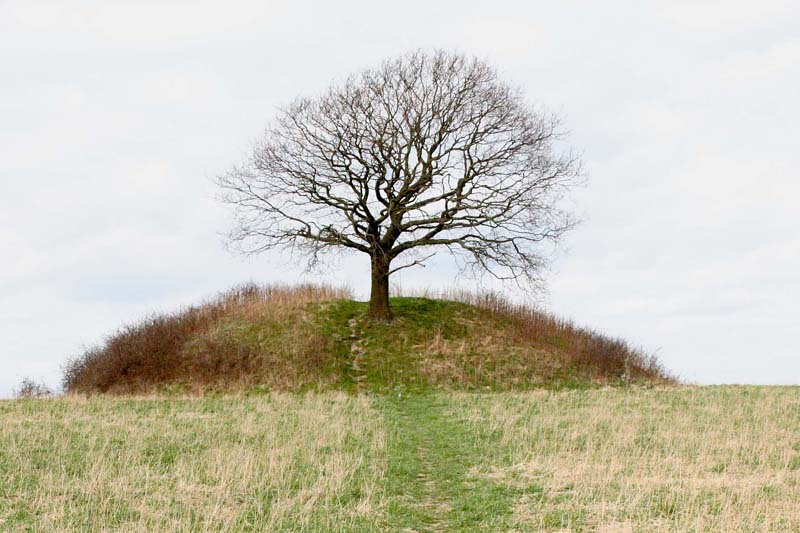
A tree growing atop a Bronze Age burial mound in Roskilde, Denmark

In Europe, Bronze Age religion is well-studied and has well-understood recurring characteristics. Traits of European Bronze Age religion include a dichotomy between the sun and the underworld, a belief in animals as significant mediators between the physical and spiritual realms, and a focus on "travel, transformation, and fertility" as cornerstones of religious practice. Wet places were focal points for rites, with ritual objects found thrown into rivers, lakes, and bogs. Joanna Bruck suggests these were treated as liminal spaces bridging the world of the living to that of the dead. She also discusses the uses of high places such as mountaintops for similar ritual purposes; geographic extremes broadly seem to have held spiritual significance to Bronze Age peoples.

Recurring symbolic themes have been described in Bronze Age symbolism across Europe. One repeated symbolism Bruck discusses is sexual intercourse, either between two humans or between humans and animals. She also discusses many figurines of ships found deposited in rivers and bogs, and the use of ships as coffins for water burials. Bronze Age cultures also practiced cremation, and cremains have been found inside model wagons and chariots. Evidence from Scotland suggests Bronze Age Britons may have practiced intentional mummification of corpses, previously thought restricted in that era to the ancient Egyptians.

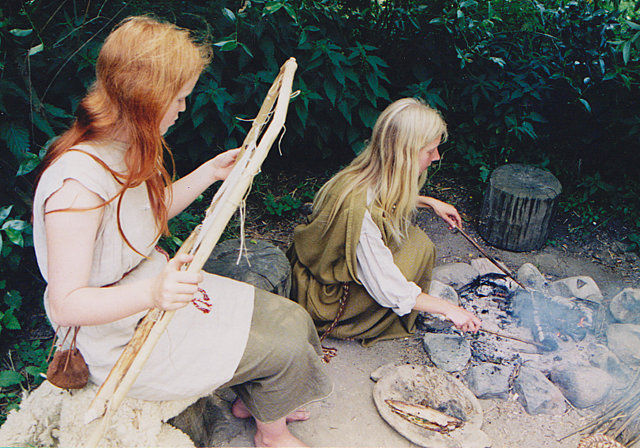
Re-enactment of Iron Age lifestyles

Iron Age European religion is known in part through literary sources, as the ancient Romans described the practices of the non-writing societies they encountered. From Roman description, it appears that the people of Roman Gaul and Roman Britain were polytheist and accepted the existence of an afterlife. A wide array of ancient authors describe the Druids, which they characterise as a class of philosophers, prophets, and mages. They discuss the importance of sacred sites to Iron Age European religion, in particular sacred groves. Some authors also claim the practice of human sacrifice. Druids attract particular attention in the study of Iron Age religion; the exact degree to which they existed and what their practices were is disputed. Contrary to the pop-culture interpretation of Druids as a major impact on Iron Age religious life, some authors doubt either their provenance or their impact. Though a specialised priestly class is evident, the Druids of Roman description may have been exaggerated and misunderstood by a society to which they were alien.

Religion in the European Iron Age was not a single, homogeneous practice throughout the whole continent. Practices across the continent for which we have strong records included Old Norse religion, Germanic paganism, and Celtic paganism. Traits such as the importance of bodies of water recur across the continent, but the oversimplification of this vast and heterogeneous body of religious faith into a single religion never rises above simple misconception. Simultaneously, the literary records of these faiths clearly miss significant aspects of their practice; although the archaeological record for Iron Age European religion is so dominated by the deposition of statuettes and sculptures into water, this goes almost completely unrecorded by the Romans. Eventually, the Romans converted to Christianity, and set to introduce their new faith to the regions under their sway. Christianity emerged in Roman Britain in the fourth century AD, (Note: Suggestions exist of a church presence in Britain as early as the second or third century AD.) and the religion was adopted disproportionately by the wealthy residents of such peripheral regions of the empire. After decades, even centuries, of bloody war, European paganism diminished throughout the first millennium AD, and the final sunset of the faith was the conversion of the Vikings in the eleventh century.

== In modern culture ==
=== Reconstruction ===
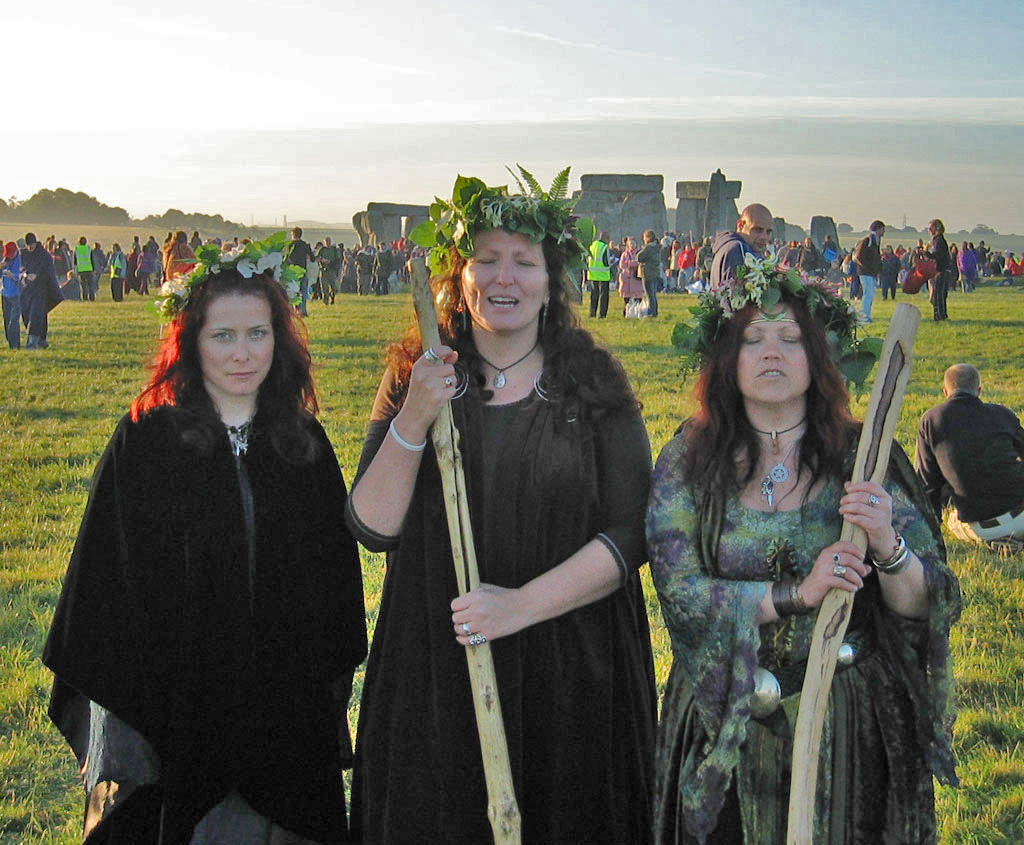
Three modern-day druidesses at Stonehenge on the summer solstice

New religious movements such as neopaganism take theological, spiritual, and cultural positions unlike those of the mainstream religions which dominate world discourse. One major stream of neopaganism is reconstructionism, where practitioners attempt to reconstruct the beliefs and practices of long-lost faiths. This is particularly associated with the prehistoric and protohistoric cultures of the European Bronze and Iron Ages. Major groups include Heathenry, which focuses on the reconstruction of Germanic and particularly Norse faiths; Celtic neopaganism, focusing on the reconstruction of the pre-Christian religions of the Celtic people; and neo-Druidism, focusing on the Druids popularly associated with protohistoric Britain. An array of minor prehistoric reconstructionist movements also exist, such as Proto-Indo-European reconstructionism. Other forms of reconstructionism exist working from a more New Age perspective, (Note: See Modern paganism and New Age.) such as neo-shamanism, the Western reconstruction of shamanic practice.

Pagan positions on prehistoric religion proper are distinct from those written by mainstream authors. Scholar-practitioner Michael F. Strmiska, writing about the Christianisation of protohistoric societies in the first millennium AD, criticises the common perspective of the "rise of Christianity"; he reinterprets it as a bloody and ruthless war where Christian invaders conquered pagan practitioners and suppressed their religious practices. Robert J. Wallis, neo-shaman and professor of visual culture at Richmond University, analyses the academic study of such movements. He argues that the anthropological practice of trying to observe as an outsider is impossible; "sitting and taking notes" is not an approved role in neo-shamanic practice, which requires either being at the centre of the practice or being absent from it entirely. He criticises the neglect of shamanism, reconstructed or otherwise, in archaeology as a consequence of a lack of interest in the form of introspective, theoretical work such study revolves around. Wallis also criticises mainstream archaeological practice as potentially offensive to reconstructionist groups, such as the excavation of bones buried in Stonehenge.

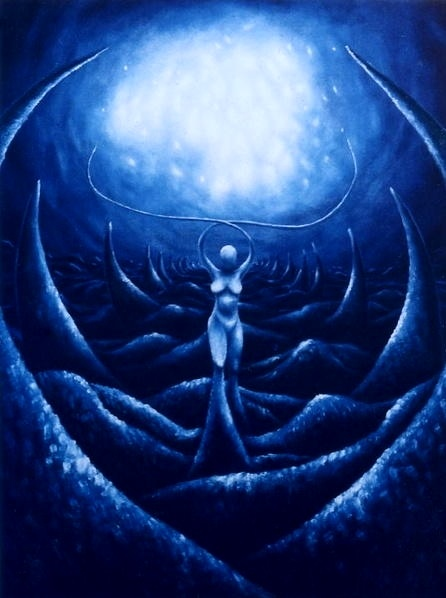
Reconstructionist's impression of a pagan goddess

The degree to which reconstructionism focuses on European "ancestral" religions is a matter of some controversy. The pagan author Marisol Charbonneau argues European pagan reconstructionism "carries notions of implicit ethnic and cultural allegiance" regardless of the practitioner's thoughts and intent; she in part ascribes the lack of communication between mostly-white neopagan practitioners and mostly-nonwhite followers of recent immigrant spiritual practices to this implication. Not all prehistoric reconstructionism is centred on European tradition; for instance, neo-shamanism is generally interpreted as having a specifically non-Western background. Heathenry poses particular problems for this issue. One of the fastest-growing religious movements in Northern Europe and elsewhere, practitioners fear it being co-opted by white supremacist movements. During the Unite the Right rally in Charlottesville, Virginia in August 2017, a number of far-right protestors used Heathen symbolism alongside imagery such as Nazi and Confederate flags. This was condemned by Heathen leaders across the globe, who were dismayed by the association of their religion with these movements in the public eye.

Wallis sees the study of reconstructionism from the opposite angle—instead of scholar-practitioners defending their religion from bad-faith outside attacks, he focuses on the phenomenon of outsiders fearing "going native", embedding themselves within a marginalised spiritual framework and receiving the ridicule of their academic peers. As a scholar-practitioner himself, Wallis dismisses this concern. Rather, his concern is a gap between scholars and practitioners limiting the understanding of prehistoric religion by placing the two at odds. He particularly concerns himself with archaeology at Stonehenge, today sacred to neo-Druids; he refers to modern practitioners' distress at Stonehenge excavations "digging the heart out of Druidic culture and belief", "stealing" a land from its ancient spiritual guardians. While Wallis does not concur with the anti-archaeological perspective of some Druids, he recognises their concerns—and the problems these concerns pose for the study of prehistoric religion. He particularly compares these concerns to those of indigenous spiritual practitioners, who are now more archaeologically respected than they were in the past, when digging up their sacred sites was an easily accepted sacrifice.

=== In fiction ===
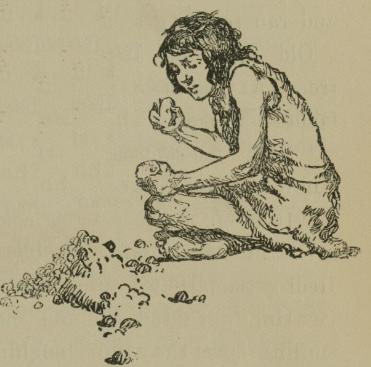
Illustration of prehistoric toolmaking in The Cave Boy of the Age of Stone

Prehistoric fiction emerged as a genre in the 19th century. A subgenre of speculative fiction, Nicholas Ruddick compares the genre to science fiction proper, noting that—although the genre lacks the future orientation most readers think synonymous with science fiction—it is more closely related to the genre than anything else, sharing a fundamental orientation of projecting human experience into eras deep into the future or past. Ruddick notes their overlap particularly in the subset of prehistoric fiction involving time travel, where modern-day characters are exposed to prehistoric society or vice versa. Where early writers interpreted prehistoric peoples as primitive "cavemen" who could barely speak, let alone comprehend complex abstract ideas such as religion, later work permits this abstraction and delves into the depths of religion's origin.

Some prehistoric fiction juxtaposes the religions of different hominins. In Before Adam by Jack London, the Cave People, who the book is told from the perspective of, have "no germs of religion, no conceptions of an unseen world", while the more advanced Fire People who overtake them can conceptualise—and fear—the future. In Jean M. Auel's influential Earth's Children series, a recurring theme is Neanderthal and H. s. sapiens interaction, for the better and the worse. Neanderthal and H. s. sapiens religion are juxtaposed throughout the books. Neanderthal religion revolves almost entirely around totemism, and a recurring element in The Clan of the Cave Bear is the female protagonist's Cave Lion totem, an unusually strong totem for a woman in a misogynistic and strictly gendered society. H. s. sapiens, on the other hand, have a near-monotheist veneration of a singular Earth Goddess, treated as the same figure for groups with vast geographic and linguistic barriers between them. Her worshippers make figurines of her, called donii, which are clearly intended to be the Venus figurines of paleontologist fascination. Auel's interpretation of Paleolithic religion so shapes the popular image as to be many general readers' entire impression, although her Neanderthal religion in particular is far more complex than many scholars ascribe.

Fiction addressing prehistoric religion does not need to be set in prehistory proper. Prehistoric artifacts, such as stone circles, are commonly used to add an ancient or occult sensibility to a fictional practice's rituals. In particular, such artifacts may be used to lend a "questionable antiquity" to new religious movements such as Wicca. They may also connect these circles to modern ethnic groups far from their provenance, such as Roma people. This contrasts the treatments of such monuments in fiction actually set in prehistory, where they are considered as self-contained and less often linked directly to modern practice. In the furthest examples of taking prehistory out of the past, some fiction engages with prehistory from a future-oriented science fiction perspective. The Neanderthal Parallax, a trilogy by Robert J. Sawyer, encounters a highly technologically advanced world where Neanderthals are the dominant human species. The Neanderthals of this world have no "God organ" and no concept of religion, although they are advanced far beyond modern technology in other aspects.

Analysis of prehistoric religion in fiction often restricts its study to the Paleolithic, neglecting later treatments of the phenomenon. The chronological focus of prehistoric fiction varies by subgenre; for instance, children's fiction particularly often deals with the Neolithic, in particular Neolithic innovations such as stone circles. Prehistoric fiction often treats religion as a reaction and monotheism specifically as an invention, a corruption of prior, "realer" prehistoric polytheist religion. Some prehistoric fiction is written from actively skeptical positions, painting ancient shamans as frauds, while others take a sympathetic position, even agreeing with the foundations of their reconstructed faith.

== See also ==
Media related to Prehistoric religion at Wikimedia Commons

- Entheogenic drugs and the archaeological record
- Evolutionary origin of religions
- List of Stone Age art
- Paleopaganism
- Religions of the ancient Near East
- Timeline of religion
