= Lop Desert =

Desert in China

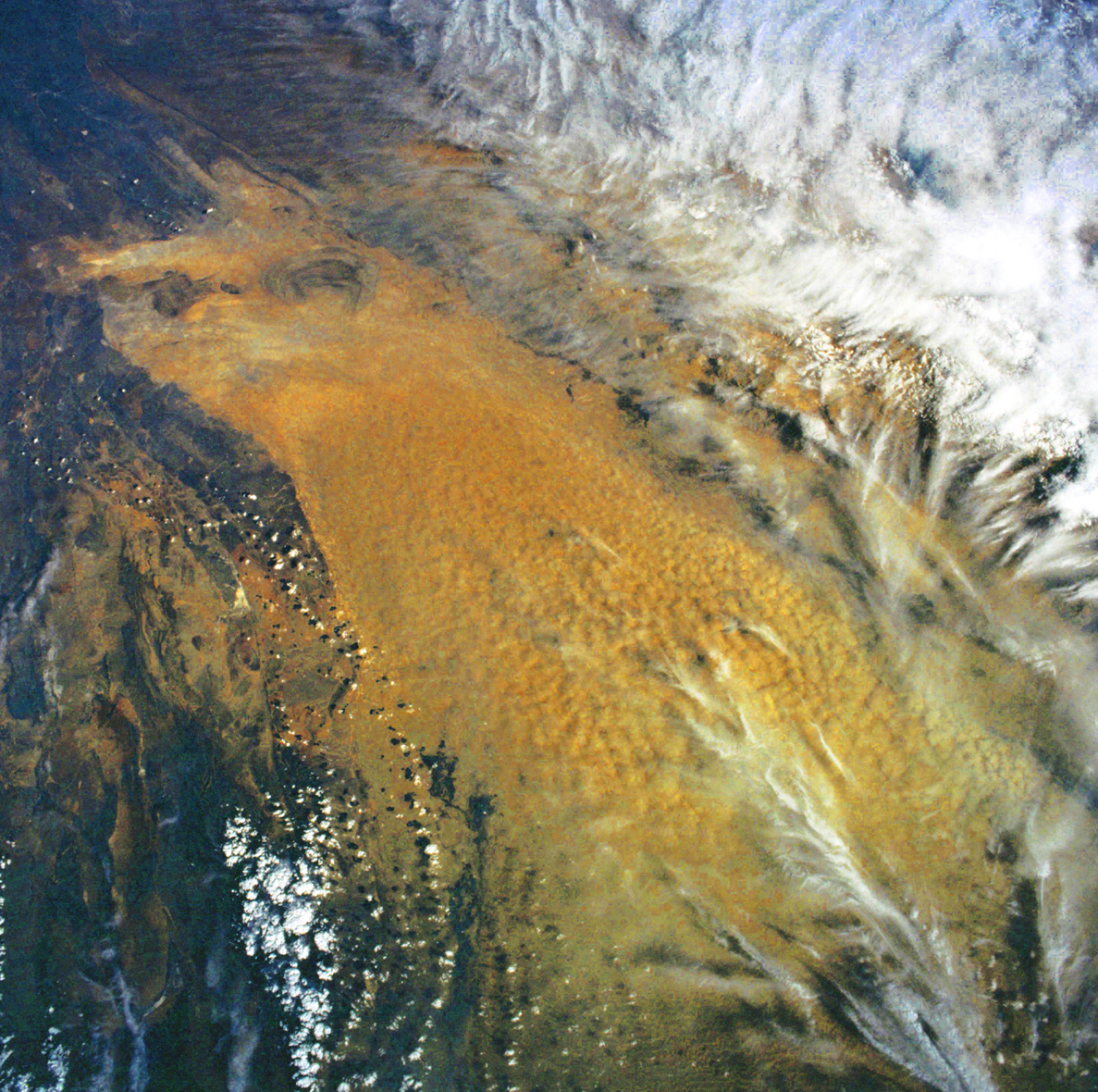
- Satellite picture of the Lop Desert with the basin of the former sea Lop Nur. In the left Kuruk-tagh, in the right Astin-tagh.
- Area: 50,000 km^{2} (19,000 mi^{2})

Geography
- Country: China
- Chinese Region: Xinjiang
- Coordinates: 40°10′0″N 90°35′0″E
- Interactive map of Lop Desert

The Lop Desert, or the Lop Depression, is a desert extending from Korla eastwards along the foot of the Kuruk-tagh (meaning Dry Mountain) to the former terminal Tarim Basin in the Xinjiang Uyghur Autonomous Region of China. It is an almost perfectly flat expanse with no topographic relief. Lake Bosten in the northwest lies at an altitude of 1,030 to 1,040 m (3,380 to 3,410 ft), while the Lop Nur in the southeast is only 250 m lower.

The desert lies within a sediment basin that was separated from the Taklamakan basin in the Pliocene and lowered towards the east by a tectonic dip-slip fault. The rivers Tarim and Konqi used to flow in the rift valley between both basins towards the south until they dried up around 1971 at Tikanlik. The road 218 from Korla to Qakilik follows the river beds. The desert is bounded in the west by this road, in the north by the Kuruk Tagh mountain range, in the east by the Bei Shan range (between Barkol Tagh and Bogda Shan), in the southeast by the Kumtag Desert and in the south by the Aqikkol valley.

== Geography ==
The Lop Desert is on the whole flat, but with three slightly more depressed areas which might form lakes if filled with water - the Lop Nur dried basin, Kara-Koshun dried basin and the Taitema Lake basin. These formed, at one time or another, the terminal lakes of the Tarim-Konque-Qarqan river system. The Tarim River changes its course through time, and therefore the location of the terminal lake also changes, causing some confusion amongst the early explorers as to the exact location of Lop Nur, and the lake was thus referred to as the "Wandering Lake."

In the past Lop Nur was a huge marsh in the eastern part of Xinjiang. Now the region is a broad, unbroken expanse of clay intermingled with sand. The clay, mostly of a yellow or yellow-grey color, is hard and thickly sprinkled with fine gravel. There are benches, flattened ridges and tabular masses of consolidated clay (yardangs) that are in a distinctly defined laminae, three stories being sometimes superimposed one upon the other, while their vertical faces are abraded, and often undercut, by the wind. The formations themselves are separated by parallel gullies or wind furrows, 6 to 20 feet deep, all sculptured in the direction of the prevailing northeast to southwest wind. There is no drifting sand or sand dunes, except in the south towards the outlying foothills of the Altyn-Tagh.

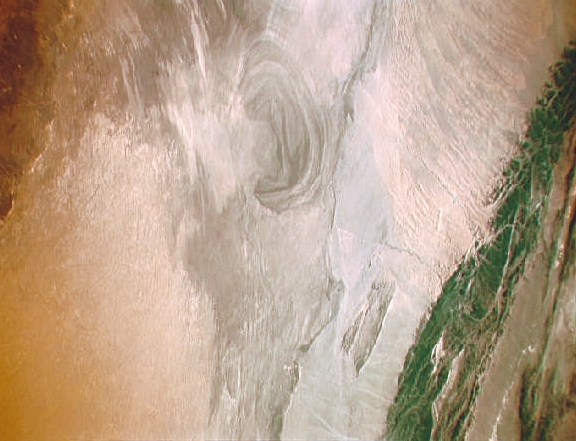
Satellite picture of the Lop Desert with the basin of the former Lop Nur Sea. The ear-shaped depression is the Lop Nur dried basin.

== Climate ==
The climate of Lop Desert is extremely arid, a study in 1984 gives a mean annual precipitation of generally less than 20 mm (0.79 in), in another study in 2008 it was recorded as 31.2 mm (1.23 in). In the depression centre below 800 m (2,600 ft) in elevation, aridity can be expected to be much more extreme. Relative humidity of the atmosphere frequently dropped to zero, with air temperature as high as 50 °C (122 °F). Annual evaporation was estimated in 1984 to be between 1,000 mm (39 in) and 1,500 mm (59 in), meaning that a lake with about 2 m (6.6 ft) in water depth will dry out within less than two years if cut off entirely from its feeding source. In 2008 the annual evaporation was reported as 2,901 mm (114.2 in).

Historically there were periods when the area was more favorable to farming and settlement than today. Studies showed that the area experienced seven major climate changes since the end of the Pleistocene.

== Lop Nur ==
There are numerous indications that suggest the presence of an extensive lake in this region which is now completely desiccated. These indications include salt-stained depressions of a lacustrine appearance; traces of former lacustrine shorelines, more or less parallel and concentric; the presence in places of vast quantities of fresh water mollusc shells (species of Lymnaea and Planorbis); the existence of belts of dead poplars; patches of dead tamarisks and extensive beds of withered reeds, all of these are always on top of the yardangs, never in the wind-etched furrows.

In Hanshu (the Book of Han, a history of China completed in 111), where it was called Puchang Hai (蒲昌海), the lake was suggested to be of a great size, with a dimension of 300 to 400 li, roughly 120–160 km (75–99 mi), in length and breadth. It was also called Yan Ze (鹽澤) in Shiji, which means "salt marsh", indicating that the lake was salty. The lake had already shrunk considerably by the Qing dynasty. It had shifted its location to Kara-Koshun by the latter half of the nineteenth century, then back again to Lop Nur in 1921 through human intervention. The building of dams by Chinese garrisons in the twentieth century blocked the water from the rivers feeding in to Lop Nur and it is now primarily salt flats. The dried-up Lop Nur basin is covered with a salt crust from 0.3 to 1 m (0.98 to 3.28 ft) thick.

== Flora and fauna ==
Natural vegetation is sparse in the region and poor in the number of species. A scientific expedition to the Lop Nur region in 1979-1982 collected only 36 species of plants, belonging to 13 families (mainly Chenopodiaceae and Compositae) and 26 genera. The expedition also collected only 127 species of animals (23 mammals, 91 birds, 7 reptiles, and 1 amphibian).

Archaeologist Sven Hedin who travelled in the region in the late nineteenth as well as the twentieth century was able to travel by boat up the rivers to the lake and saw a multitude of wildlife. However, many wild animals, such as the tiger, wolf and wild hog which had been found by former explorers, have now disappeared. Nevertheless, it is still one of the last refuges of wild Bactrian camel (Camelus ferus) in the world. These wild camels may be found in the reed oases on the north edge of the desert. Poplars forests and tamarix shrubs used to be extensively distributed along the lower Tarim River Valley forming the so-called "Green Corridor", but as the lower Tarim River has been drying since 1972 due to the construction of dams, they have greatly deteriorated and some have disappeared. The Lop Nur Wild Camel National Nature Reserve was created in 2001 to preserve wild Bactrian camels and other wildlife in the region.

== Sand storms ==
The whole of this region is swept bare of sand by the terrific sand storms (burans) of the spring months and the particles of wind-blown sand act like a sand blast. Abrasion of the rocks forms yardangs. The desert itself is abraded, filed, eroded and carried bodily away into the network of lakes in which the Tarim River wanders. The sand also blows across the lower, constantly shifting waterways of the Tarim River and deposits itself onto gigantic dunes that choke the eastern end of the Taklamakan Desert. The extreme weather and ever moving sand dunes have resulted in the deaths of hundreds of people. The esteemed biologist Peng Jiamu disappeared in the desert in 1980.

== See also ==
- Tarim Basin
- Lake Bosten
