= Kashgar River =

River in Xinjiang, China

Kashgar

Location
- Country: China and Kyrgyzstan

Physical characteristics
- Mouth: Yarkand
  - coordinates: 39°45′N 78°24′E

Basin features
- Progression: Yarkand→ Tarim→ Taitema Lake

The Kashgar River (also spelled Kaxgar; known in its upper course as the Kizilsu; Uyghur: قەشقەر دەرياسى, romanized: Qeshqer deryasi; simplified Chinese: 喀什噶尔河; traditional Chinese: 喀什噶爾河) is a river in the Xinjiang Uygur Autonomous Region of China.

It rises on the eastern slopes of the Pamir Mountains, near the Alay Valley close to the border with Kyrgyzstan. From there, the river flows generally eastward, passing through the Erkeshtam Pass and the city of Kashgar, after which it continues into the northwestern margins of the Taklamakan Desert. The Kashgar River ultimately joins the Yarkand River. Among its tributaries is the Ma'erkansu River.
