= Streptomyces lopnurensis =

Scientific classification
- Domain: Bacteria
- Kingdom: Bacillati
- Phylum: Actinomycetota
- Class: Actinomycetes
- Order: Streptomycetales
- Family: Streptomycetaceae
- Genus: Streptomyces
- Species: S. lopnurensis

Binomial name
- Streptomyces lopnurensis Zheng et al. 2014

Type strain
- CCTCC AA 2013018, TRM49590

Species of bacterium

Streptomyces lopnurensis is a bacterium species from the genus of Streptomyces which has been isolated from soil from Lop Nur in the Xinjiang Province in China.

== See also ==
- List of Streptomyces species
