= Lop Nur =

Former salt lake in Bayingolin Prefecture, Xinjiang, China

Coordinates: 40°10′N 90°35′E

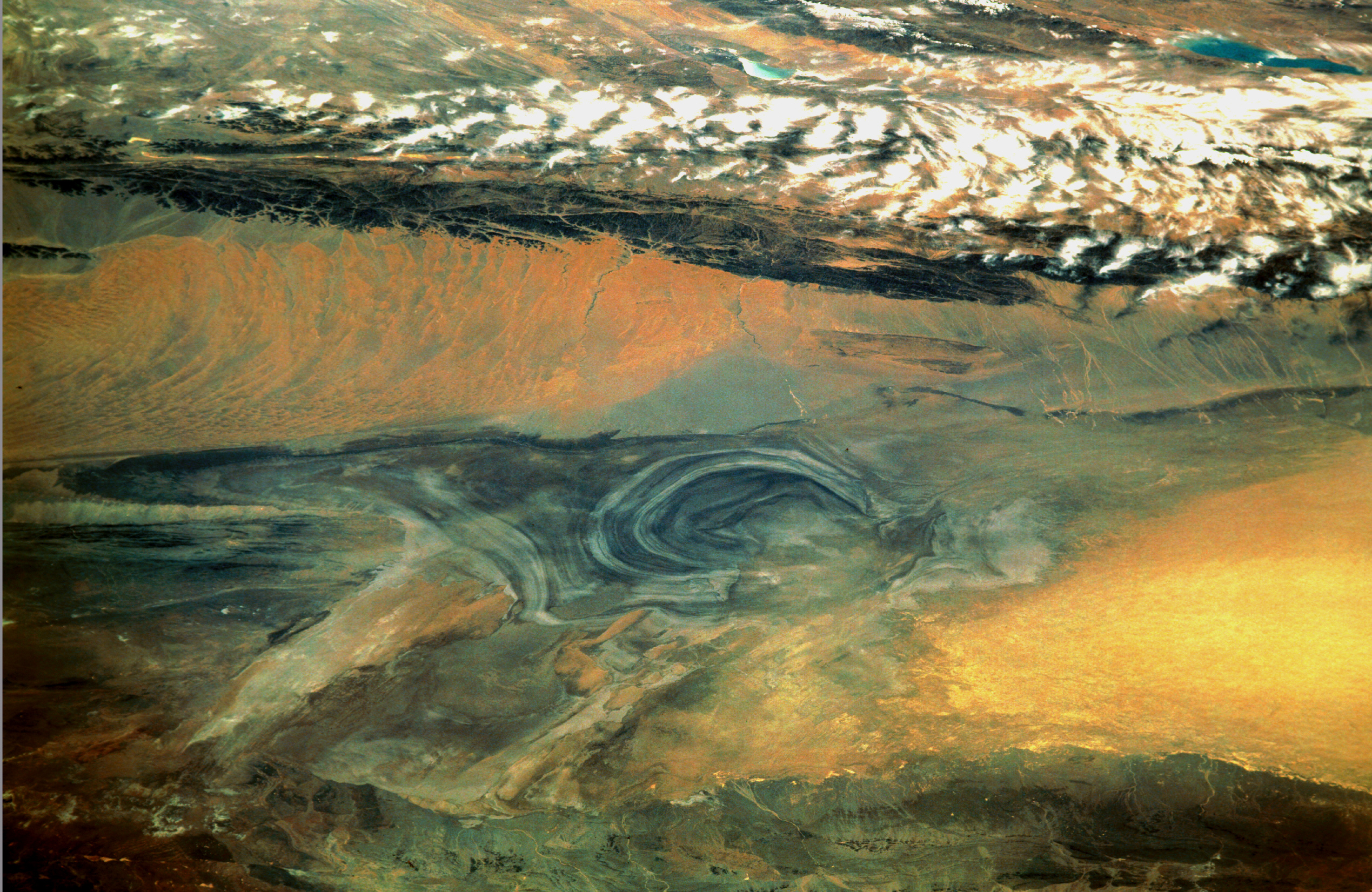
- Satellite picture of the Basin of the former sea of Lop Nur; the concentric shorelines of the vanished lake are visible.

- Location of Lop Nur within Xinjiang Lop Nur (China)

Chinese name
- Traditional Chinese: 羅布泊
- Simplified Chinese: 罗布泊
- Literal meaning: Lop lake
Transcriptions
Standard Mandarin
- Hanyu Pinyin: Luóbù Pō
- Wade–Giles: Lo^{2}-pu^{4} P'o^{1}
- IPA: [lwǒpû pʰwó]

Alternative Chinese name
- Traditional Chinese: 羅布淖爾
- Simplified Chinese: 罗布淖尔
- Literal meaning: Lop Lake
Transcriptions
Standard Mandarin
- Hanyu Pinyin: Luóbù Nào'ěr
- Wade–Giles: Lo^{2}-pu^{4} Nao^{4}-'erh^{3}
- IPA: [lwǒpû nâʊàɚ]

Mongolian name
- Mongolian Cyrillic: ᠯᠣᠪ ᠨᠠᠭᠤᠷ; Лоб Нуур

Uyghur name
- Uyghur: لوپنۇر
Transcriptions
- Latin Yëziqi: Lopnur
- Yengi Yeziⱪ: Lopnur
- Siril Yëziqi: Лопнур

Lop Nur or Lop Nor (Uyghur: لوپنۇر, Oirat: ᠯᠣ᠊ᠫ
ᠨᡇᡇᠷ, romanized: Lob nuur, from an Oirat Mongolic name meaning "Lop Lake", where "Lop" is a toponym of unknown origin) is a now largely dried-up salt lake formerly located within the Lop Depression in the eastern fringe of the Tarim Basin in the southeastern portion of the Xinjiang Autonomous Region, northwestern China, between the Taklamakan and Kumtag deserts. Administratively, the lake is in Lop Nur town (Chinese: 罗布泊镇; pinyin: Luóbùpō zhèn), also known as Luozhong (罗中; Luózhōng) of Ruoqiang County, which in its turn is part of the Bayingolin Mongol Autonomous Prefecture.

The lake system, into which the Tarim River and Shule River drain from the west and east respectively, is the last remnant of the historical post-glacial Tarim Lake, which once covered more than 10,000 km^{2} (3,900 sq mi) in the Tarim Basin but had progressively shrunk throughout the Holocene due to rain shadowing by the Tibetan Plateau. Lop Nur is hydrologically endorheic; it is landbound, has no outlet, and has relied largely on meltwater runoffs from the Tianshan, Kunlun and the western Qilian Mountains. The lake measured 3,100 km^{2} (1,200 sq mi) in 1928, but has dried up due to construction of reservoirs which dammed the flow of water feeding into the lake, and only small seasonal lakes and salt marshes may form. The dried-up Lop Nur Basin is covered with a salt crust ranging from 30 to 100 cm (12 to 39 in) in thickness.

An area to the northwest of Lop Nur has been used as the principal nuclear testing site of the People's Republic of China. Since the discovery of potash at the site in the mid-1990s, it is also the location of a large-scale mining operation. There are some restricted areas under military management and cultural relic protection points in the region, which are not open to the public.

== History ==
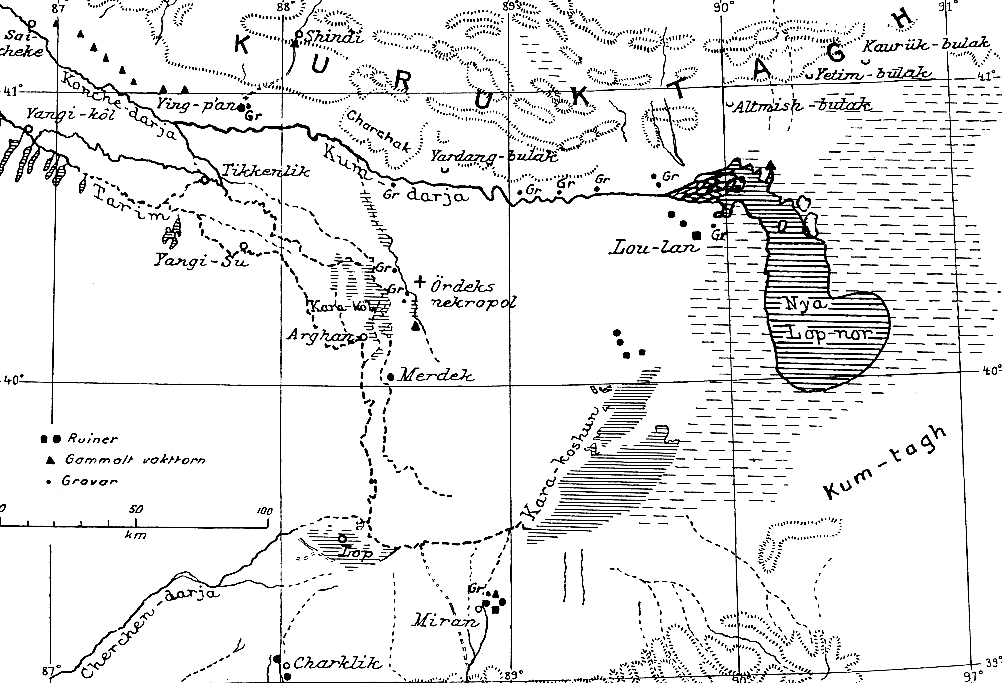
Map of Lop Nur by Folke Bergman, 1935. Kara-Koshun where the terminal lake was found in 1867 is located to the south-west of Lop Nor, and the lake had shifted back to Lop Nor by the time this map was drawn. Taitema Lake was a smaller transit lake and located to the west of Kara-Koshun.

From around 1800 BC until the 9th century the lake supported a thriving Tocharian culture. Archaeologists have discovered the buried remains of settlements, as well as several of the Tarim mummies, along its ancient shoreline. Former water resources of the Tarim River and Lop Nur nurtured the kingdom of Loulan since the second century BC, an ancient civilisation along the Silk Road, which skirted the lake-filled basin. Loulan became a client state of the Chinese empire in 55 BC, renamed Shanshan. Faxian went by the Lop Desert on his way to the Indus valley (395–414), followed by later Chinese pilgrims. Marco Polo in his travels passed through the Lop Desert. In the 19th century and early 20th century, the explorers Ferdinand von Richthofen, Nikolai Przhevalsky, Sven Hedin and Aurel Stein visited and studied the area. It is also likely that Swedish soldier Johan Gustaf Renat had visited the area when he was helping the Zunghars to produce maps over the area in the eighteenth century.

The lake was given various names in ancient Chinese texts. In Shiji it was called Yan Ze (鹽澤, literally Salt Marsh), indicating its saline nature, near which was located the ancient Loulan Kingdom. In Hanshu it was called Puchang Hai (蒲昌海, literally Sea of Abundant Reed) and was given a dimension of 300 to 400 li (roughly 120–160 km) in length and breadth, indicating it was once a lake of great size. These early texts also mentioned the belief, mistaken as it turns out, that the lake joins the Yellow River at Jishi through an underground channel as the source of the river.

The lake was referred to as the "Wandering Lake" in the early 20th century due to the Tarim River changing its course, causing its terminal lake to alter its location between the Lop Nur dried basin, the Kara-Koshun dried basin and the Taitema Lake basin. This shift of the terminal lake caused some confusion amongst the early explorers as to the exact location of Lop Nur. Imperial maps from the Qing dynasty showed Lop Nur to be located in similar position to the present Lop Nur dried basin, but the Russian geographer Nikolay Przhevalsky instead found the terminal lake at Kara-Koshun in 1867. Sven Hedin visited the area in 1900–1901 and suggested that the Tarim river periodically changed its course to and from between its southbound and northbound direction, resulting in a shift in the position of the terminal lake. The change in the course of the river, which resulted in Lop Nur drying up, was also suggested by Hedin as the reason why ancient settlements such as Loulan had perished.

In 1921, due to human intervention, the terminal lake shifted its position back to Lop Nur. The lake measured 2400 km^{2} in area in 1930–1931. In 1934, Sven Hedin went down the new Kuruk Darya ("Dry River") in a canoe. He found the delta to be a maze of channels and the new lake so shallow that it was difficult to navigate even in a canoe. He had previously walked the dry Kuruk Darya in a caravan in 1900.

In 1952 the terminal lake then shifted to Taitema Lake when the Tarim River and Konque River were separated through human intervention, and Lop Nur dried out again by 1964. In 1972, the Daxihaizi Reservoir was built at Tikanlik, water supply to the lake was cut off, and all the lakes for the most part then dried out, with only small seasonal lakes forming in local depressions in Taitema. The loss of water to the lower Tarim River Valley also led to the deterioration and loss of poplar forests and tamarix shrubs that used to be extensively distributed along the lower Tarim River Valley forming the so-called "Green Corridor". In 2000, in an effort to prevent further deterioration of the ecosystem, water was diverted from Lake Bosten in an attempt to fill the Taitema Lake. The Taitema Lake however had shifted 30 to 40 kilometres (19 to 25 mi) westwards during the past 40 years due in part to the spread of the desert. Another cause of the destabilization of the desert has been the cutting of poplars and willows for firewood; in response, a restoration project to reclaim the poplar forests was initiated.

The Kara-Koshun dried basin may be considered part of the greater Lop Nur.

On 17 June 1980, Chinese scientist Peng Jiamu disappeared while walking into Lop Nur in search of water. His body was never found, and his disappearance remains a mystery. On 3 June 1996, the Chinese explorer Yu Chunshun died while trying to walk across Lop Nur.

== Nuclear weapons test base ==
Lop Nur
- Chinese: 罗布泊核试验场
- Traditional Chinese: 羅布泊核試驗場
- Literal meaning: Lop Nur Nuclear Test Site
Transcriptions
Standard Mandarin
- Hanyu Pinyin: Luóbùpō Hé Shìyàn Chǎng
Yue: Cantonese
- Jyutping: lo4 bou3 pok3 hat6 si3jim6 coeng4

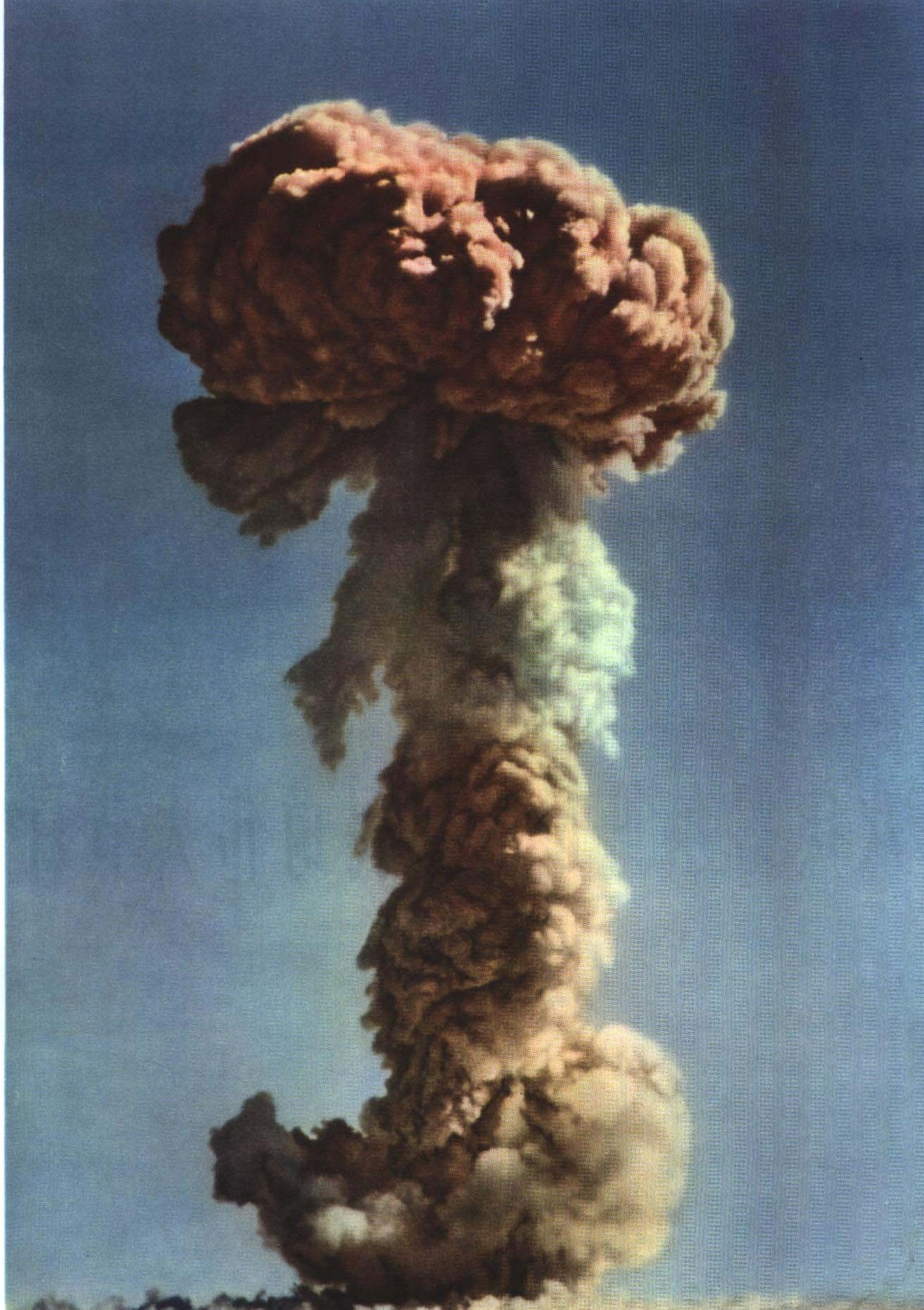
Mushroom cloud of the first Chinese nuclear weapon test, Project 596, at Lop Nur in 1964

Lop Nur, situated in the arid Xinjiang region of China's far west, serves as an extensive military base. This location was selected for nuclear testing due to its desolate and isolated nature, devoid of any permanent inhabitants, though the broader Xinjiang region is home to the Uyghurs, a predominantly Muslim ethnic group that has historically faced persecution in China. The Uyghurs have persistently voiced concerns regarding the health risks posed by the towering mushroom clouds and the release of radioactive fallout.

Initially, Chinese leadership sought to construct the country's nuclear test site in the Dunhuang area of Gansu. Concerns about weather resulted in a switch to Lop Nur. China established the Lop Nur Nuclear Test Base on 16 October 1959 with Soviet assistance in selection of the site, with its headquarters at Malan Air Base (马兰, Mǎlán), about 125 kilometres (78 mi) northwest of Qinggir. Construction was delayed after the Soviet Union ended its technical assistance to China in 1960.

The first Chinese nuclear bomb test, codenamed "Project 596", occurred at Lop Nur on 16 October 1964. China detonated its first full-scale thermonuclear weapon, codenamed 639, on 17 June 1967. Until 1996, 45 nuclear tests were conducted. These nuclear tests were conducted by dropping bombs from aircraft, mounted on towers, launching missiles, detonating weapons underground and in the atmosphere.

On 29 July 1996, China conducted its 45th and final nuclear test at Lop Nor, and issued a formal moratorium on nuclear testing the following day, although further subcritical tests were suspected. In 2009, Jun Takada, a Japanese scientist, published the results of his computer simulation which suggests – based on deaths from Soviet tests – that 194,000 people could have died in China from nuclear-related illnesses. Enver Tohti, an exiled pro-Uyghur independence activist, claimed that cancer rates in the province of Xinjiang were 30 to 35% higher than the national average. In 2012, China announced plans to spend US$1 million to clean up the Malan nuclear base in Lop Nor to create a red tourism site.

In 2020, the U.S. accused China of conducting underground low-yield nuclear tests at Lop Nur in the State Department's Nuclear Compliance Report. China denied the claim, and Jeffrey Lewis pointed to satellite and seismic signatures of such tests being "indistinguishable" from CTBT-compliant subcritical testing. In 2023, satellite open-source intelligence showed evidence of drilling shafts in Lop Nur where nuclear weapons testing could resume.

Further analysis of the satellite images since 2017 also uncovered the development of new infrastructure at the site. This included the construction of new roads, power lines, an electrical substation, and a support area with multiple buildings. What was once a modest site with only a few buildings had transformed into a modern and sophisticated complex, complete with security fences. One of the new structures was a bunker that was fortified with earthen berms and lightning arresters, indicating its suitability for handling high explosives. Tests on miniaturization of missiles and warheads can also be possibly carried out at this site. However, the Chinese Foreign Ministry has dismissed the report and its "utterly irresponsible" claims. China has denied any nuclear testing plans on the site.

In December 2023, a report emerged indicating that China was making preparations to resume nuclear tests in a remote desert. Satellite imagery provided evidence of these preparations, revealing the presence of a drilling rig that had created a deep vertical shaft. This shaft was believed to be designed to contain the destructive power of radiation resulting from large nuclear explosions. Some analysts believe that China has been conducting "supercritical tests that create a self-sustained chain reaction in an underground containment vessel but stop well short of a full yield." In January 2025, analysts detected newly excavated soil in the northern rim of the Lop Nur complex, believed to be from horizontal tunnels used for lower-yield nuclear weapons tests.

Despite its extreme secrecy, two US delegations totaling six Americans have visited Lop Nur. In 1982, Harold Agnew, former director of Los Alamos National Laboratory (LANL), visited while working as CEO of General Atomics. In 1990, an LANL delegation of John Hopkins, his wife Adele Hopkins, and intelligence officers Terry Hawkins, Danny Stillman, and Bob Daniels visited. They were toured through the site's underground testing shafts, laser inertial confinement fusion and hydrodynamic test facilities. Hopkins and Hawkins recalled in 2020 that the Chinese scientists were very eager to demonstrate detailed knowledge across nuclear weapons science and the professional careers of the US delegation. The Chinese scientists had hoped for some experimental collaboration with the US, and offered to jointly research nuclear electromagnetic pulses, but the US side considered collaboration highly unfavorable.

== Ecology ==
Lop Nur is home to the wild Bactrian camel, which is a species separate from the Bactrian camel. The camels have continued to breed naturally despite the nuclear testing. China signed the Comprehensive Nuclear-Test-Ban Treaty in 1996 but did not ratify it. Subsequently, the camels were classified as an endangered species on the IUCN Red List. Since the cessation of nuclear testing at Lop Nur, human incursions into the area have caused a decline in the camel population. Wild Bactrian camels have been classified as critically endangered since 2002 and approximately half of the 1400 remaining wild Bactrian camels live on the former Lop Nur test base, which has been designated the Lop Nur Wild Camel National Nature Reserve.

== Transportation ==
A highway from Hami to Lop Nur (Xinjiang Provincial Highway 235) was completed in 2006.

The Hami–Lop Nur Railway, which runs 374.83 kilometres (232.91 mi) north to Hami, along the same route, opened to freight operations in November 2012. The railway is used to transport potassium-rich salt mined at the lake to the Lanzhou–Xinjiang railway.

It is also served by the Hotan–Ruoqiang railway, which loops around the south and west side of the Tarim Basin, part of the Taklimakan Desert railway loop, joined with sections of the Golmud–Korla railway, Kashgar–Hotan railway, and Southern Xinjiang railway.

== Archaeological sites ==
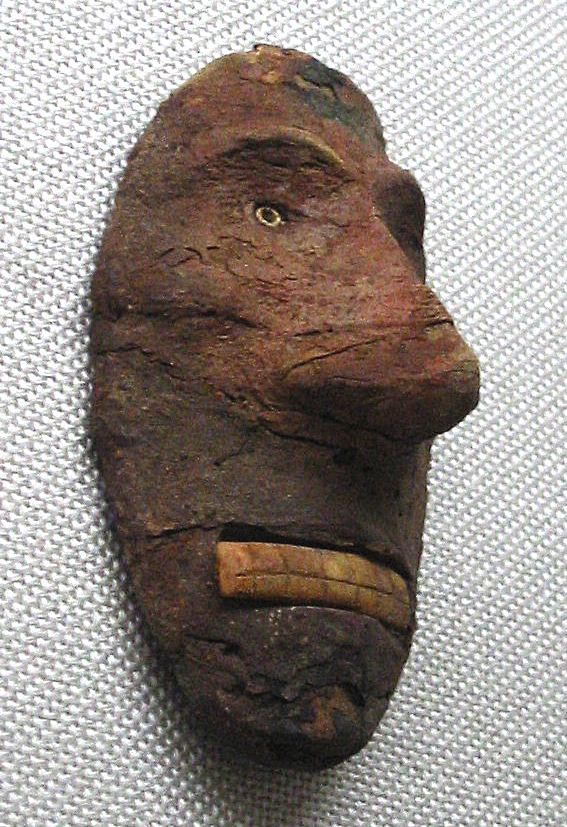
Mask from second millennium BCE

Given the extreme dryness and resulting thin population, remains of some buildings survived for a significant period of time. When ancient graves - some a few thousand years old - were opened, the bodies were often found to be mummified and grave goods well preserved. The earliest sites are associated with an ancient people of indigenous Siberian origin.

=== Loulan ===
Loulan or Kroran was an ancient kingdom based around an important oasis city already known in the 2nd century BCE on the north-eastern edge of the Lop Desert. It was renamed Shanshan after Chinese took control of the kingdom in 1st century BCE. It was abandoned some time in the seventh century. Its location was discovered by Sven Hedin in 1899, who excavated some houses and found a wooden Kharosthi tablet and many Chinese manuscripts from the Jin dynasty (266–420). Aurel Stein also excavated at the site in the beginning of the 20th century, while Chinese archaeologists explored the area in the latter part of the 20th century. A mummy called the Beauty of Loulan was found at a cemetery site on the bank of Töwän River.

=== Xiaohe Cemetery ===
The Xiaohe Cemetery is located to the west of Lop Nur. This Bronze Age burial site is an oblong sand dune, from which more than thirty well preserved mummies have been excavated. The entire Xiaohe Cemetery contains about 330 tombs, about 160 of which have been violated by grave robbers.

A local hunter guided the Swedish explorer and archeologist Folke Bergman to the site in 1934. An excavation project by the Xinjiang Cultural Relics and Archaeology Institute began in October 2003. A total of 167 tombs have been dug up since the end of 2002 and excavations have revealed hundreds of smaller tombs built in layers, as well as other precious artifacts. In 2006, a valuable archeological finding was uncovered: a boat-shaped coffin wrapped in ox hide, containing the mummified body of a young woman.

=== Qäwrighul ===
In 1979, some of the earliest of the Tarim mummies were discovered in burial sites at Qäwrighul (Gumugou), which is located to the west of Lop Nur, on the Könchi (Kongque) river. Forty-two graves, most of which dated from 2100 to 1500 BC, were found. There were two types of tomb at the site, belonging to two different time periods. The first type of burial featured shaft pit graves, some of which had poles at either end to mark east and west. Bodies were found extended, usually facing east, and sometimes were wrapped in wool weavings and wearing felt hats. Artifacts found included basketry, wheat grains, cattle and sheep/goat horns, bird bone necklaces and bracelets, nephrite beads, and fragments of copper (or bronze), although no pottery was discovered.

The second type of burial, from a later period, also consisted of shaft pit graves, surrounded by seven concentric circles of poles. Six male graves were found, in which the bodies were extended on their backs, and facing towards the east. Few artifacts were found, except for some traces of copper, or bronze.

=== Miran ===
Miran is located to the south-west of Lop Nur. Buddhist monasteries were excavated here, and murals and sculptures showed artistic influences from India and Central Asia, with some showing influences from as far as Rome.

== See also ==
- Aral Sea
- Charklik (ancient settlement)
- List of nuclear weapons tests of China
- Ruoqiang Town
- Silk Road transmission of Buddhism
- Tarim Basin
- Tarim mummies
