= Karakoshun Lake =

Inland lake in Xinjiang, China

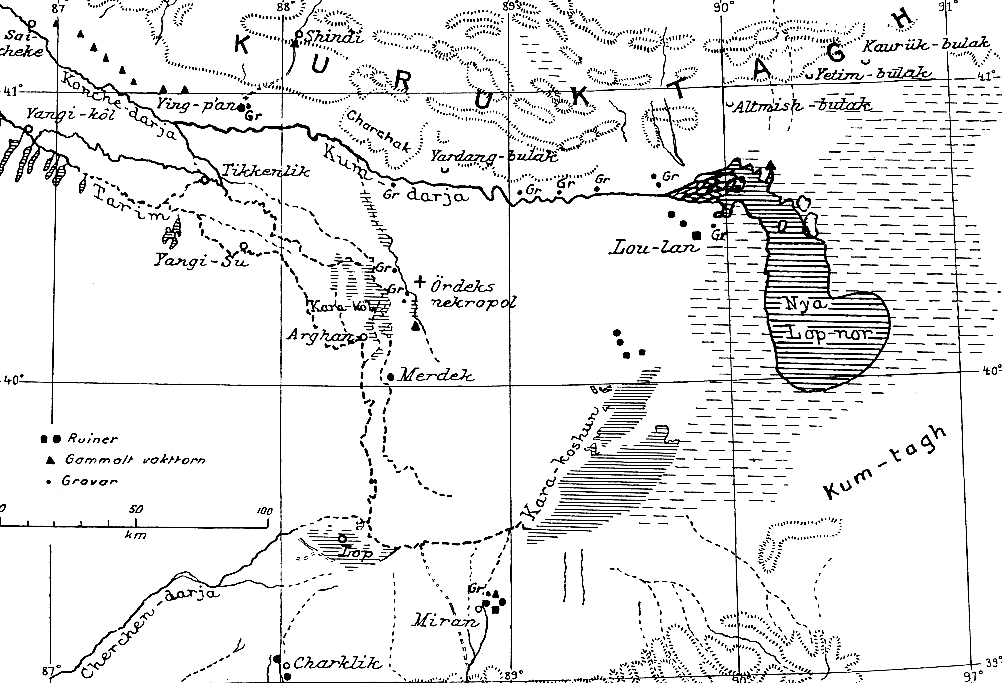
Folke Bergman's map (1939)

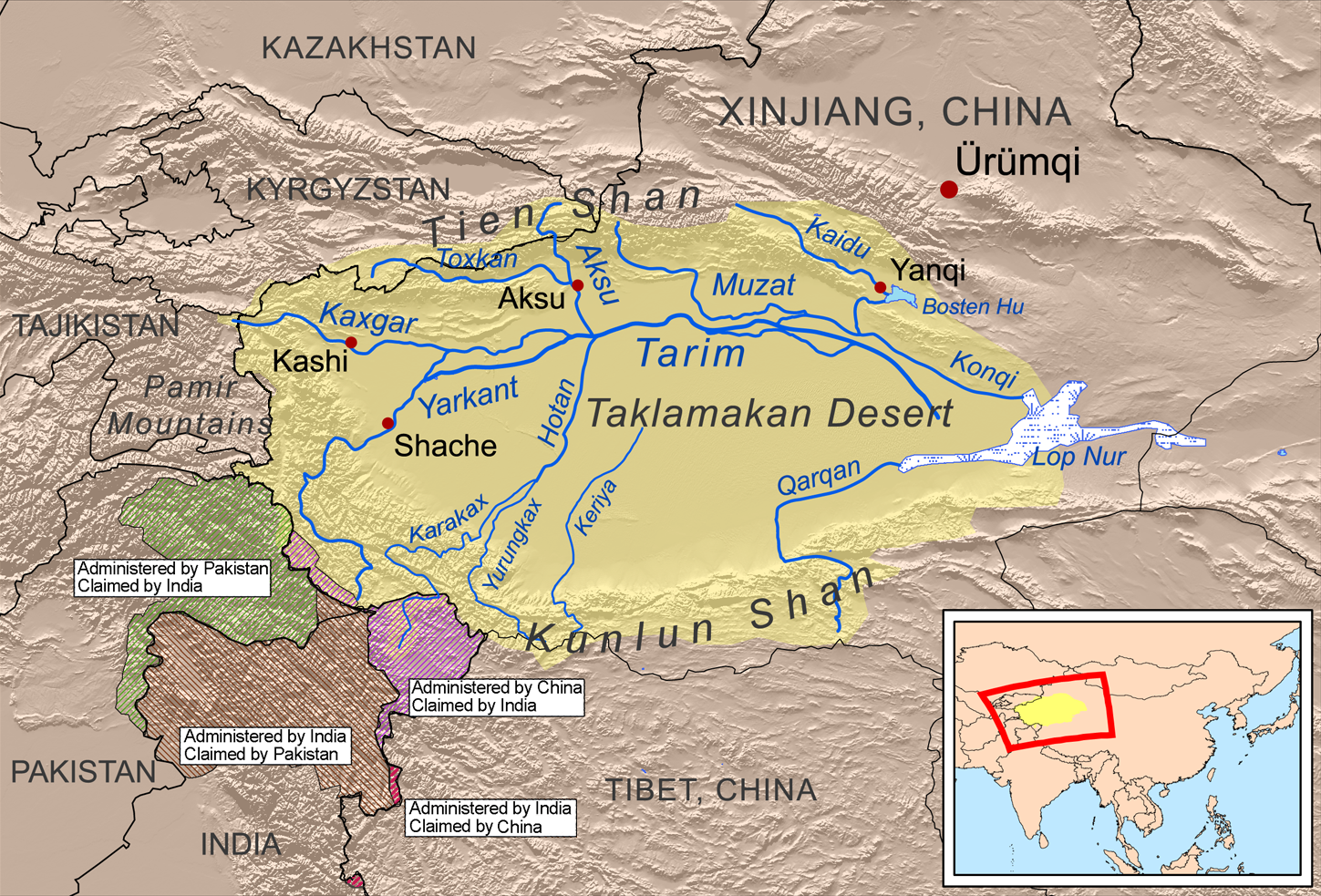
The Rivers in the Tarim Basin of the Taklamakan Desert

Karakoshun Lake (Chinese: 喀拉库顺湖) was an inland lake located in the Bayingolin Mongol Autonomous Prefecture, Xinjiang Uyghur Autonomous Region, China, which is now dry.

== General ==
Karakoshun Lake is one of the major depressions in the southeastern part of the Tarim Basin, the others including Lop Nur and Taitema Lake. Until the first half of the 20th century, it was the terminal lake of the Tarim River, which emptied into Lop Nur, recorded by the explorers, Nikolay Przhevalsky, Sven Hedin and Folke Bergman as the "Kara koshun" wetland. It also received water from Taitema Lake, which collected water from the Qiemo River.

By the end of the 20th century, Karakoshun Lake had completely dried up.

== Transport ==
- Xinjiang Region Highway S235 (China National Highway 315 to Hami)

== See also ==
- Lop Nur
