= Malan Air Base =

Malan Air Base 马兰基地
- IATA: none; ICAO: none

Summary
- Airport type: Military
- Operator: People's Liberation Army Air Force
- Location: Korla, Bayingolin Mongol AP, Xinjiang
- Opened: June 1959; 67 years ago
- Elevation AMSL: 1,104 m (3,622 ft)
- Coordinates: 42.183629°N 87.186250°E

Map
- Location of airport in Xinjiang

Malan Air Base
- Simplified Chinese: 马兰基地
- Traditional Chinese: 馬蘭基地
Transcriptions
Standard Mandarin
- Hanyu Pinyin: Mǎlán Jīdì

Malan Airbase is a Chinese test facility in Xinjiang Uygur Autonomous Region. Originally built to support China’s nuclear weapons program, it is now increasingly linked to the development and testing of experimental aircraft. The base has drawn comparisons to the United States' Area 51 because of its remote location and its use of next-generation weapon systems.

== History ==
=== Cold War era ===
Malan Air Base was constructed in the late 1950s as part of China's Two Bombs, One Satellite project. The nearby Lop Nur site was chosen for nuclear testing due to its remote location in the Gobi Desert. From 1964 to 1996, China conducted about 45 nuclear tests at Lop Nur, with Malan serving as the main control, support, and logistics base.

=== Aircraft and UAV testing ===
In December 2019, satellite imagery revealed a large lineup of Chinese unmanned aircraft, both operational and developmental, parked on the tarmac at Malan, underscoring that Malan had become a central hub for drone experimentation. In 2022, satellite images revealed the expansion of infrastructure at Malan, including new hangars, taxiways and facilities. A satellite image from May 2025 revealed a previously unseen, very large stealth flying-wing unmanned aircraft at Malan, roughly in the same class as the B-2 Spirit and larger than many known Chinese UAVs.

== See also ==
- Area 51
- Kapustin Yar
- White Sands Missile Range
