= Kumtag Desert =

Desert in northwestern China

Coordinates: 39.8°N 92.2°E

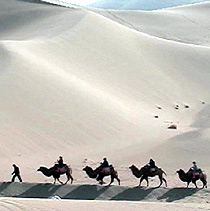
Kumtag Desert

The Kumtag Desert (Chinese: 库姆塔格沙漠; pinyin: Kùmǔtǎgé Shāmò; Uyghur: قۇمتاغ قۇملۇقى, romanized: Qumtagh Qumluqi) is an arid landform in northwestern China.

== Geography ==
The Kumtag Desert has an area of approximately 22,900 km^{2} (8,800 sq mi). Sometimes considered part of the Gobi Desert, the Kumtag lies east-southeast of the Desert of Lop and is bordered by Dunhuang in the east. The southern rim of the Kumtag is marked by a labyrinth of hills, dotted in groups and irregular clusters. Between these and the Altyn-Tagh is a broad latitudinal valley, seamed with watercourses that come down from the foothills of the Altyn-tagh. Grapes and other crops are grown in oases in low-lying areas. Elsewhere, the desert supports scrubby desert plants, water reaching them in some instances at intervals of years only. This part of the desert has a general slope northwest towards the relative depression of the Kara-koshun. A noticeable feature of the Kumtag is the presence of large accumulations of drift-sand, especially along the foot of the desert ranges, where it rises into dunes sometimes as much as 250 feet (76 m) in height and climbs the flanks of ranges themselves.

Administratively, the desert is located in the Ruoqiang (Qakilik) County of Xinjiang and Aksai Kazakh Autonomous County and Dunhuang City of Gansu, near their border with Qinghai.

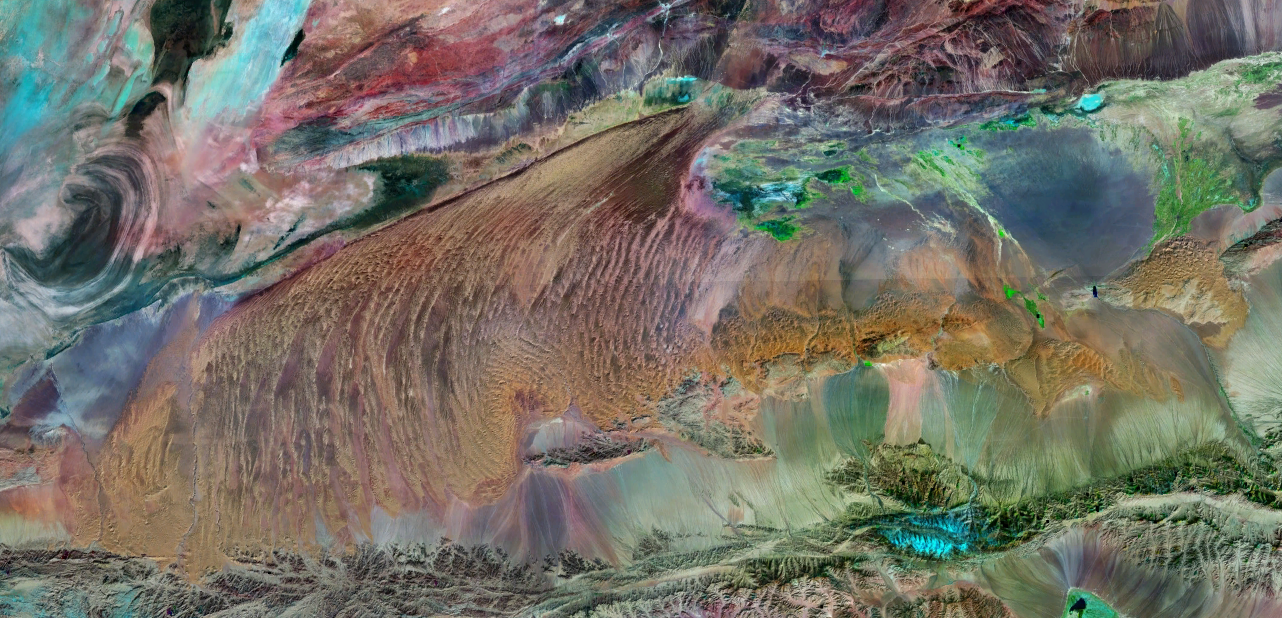
A satellite image of the Kumtag. The ear-shaped formation on the left is the Lop Nor; the mountain range along the bottom edge of the photo is the Altyn Tagh.

=== Kumtag Desert Scenic Area ===
The Kumtag Desert is sometimes confused with the Kumtag Desert Scenic Area (Chinese: 库木塔格沙漠; pinyin: Kùmùtǎgé Shāmò), which is a distinct 2,500 km^{2} (970 sq mi) region approximately 300 km (190 mi) to the northwest, bordered by Shanshan County in the north. Both place names have the same English romanization, but their Chinese names differ slightly.

== Ongoing desertification ==
The Kumtag Desert is expanding and threatening to engulf previously productive lands with its arid wasteland character, a result of centuries of overgrazing and unsustainable agricultural practices. According to The Sydney Morning Herald, "Towering sand dunes [of the Kumtag Desert] loom over the ancient Chinese city of Dunhuang". The desertification adjacent to the Kumtag Desert also threatens archaeological sites, and is part of a larger problem in northern China where the rate of desertification exceeded 1,000 km^{2} (390 sq mi) per annum as of 2007. To mitigate the desertification, the town of Dunhuang has placed restrictions on new water-well development or new farm additions, as well as limits on tourism.

== Prevailing winds and sands ==
The prevailing winds in this region blow from the west and northwest during the summer, winter and autumn. Though in spring, when they are more violent, they come from the northeast, as in the desert of Lop. The arrangement of the sand here agrees perfectly with the law laid down by Grigory Potanin, that in the basins of Central Asia the sand is heaped up in greater mass on the south, all along the bordering mountain ranges where the floor of the depressions lies at the highest level. The country to the north of the desert ranges is thus summarily described by Sven Hedin: "The first zone of drift sand is succeeded by a region that exhibits proofs of wind modelling on an extraordinarily energetic and well-developed scale, the results corresponding to the jardangs and the wind-eroded gullies of the Desert of Lop. Both sets of phenomena lie parallel to one another; from this we may infer that the winds which prevail in the two deserts are the same. Next comes, sharply demarcated from the zone just described, a more or less thin kamish steppe growing on level ground; and this in turn is followed by another very narrow belt of sand, immediately south of Achik-kuduk. Finally in the extreme north we have the characteristic and sharply defined belt of kamish steppe, stretching from east-northeast to west-southwest and bounded on north and south by high, sharp cut clay terraces.

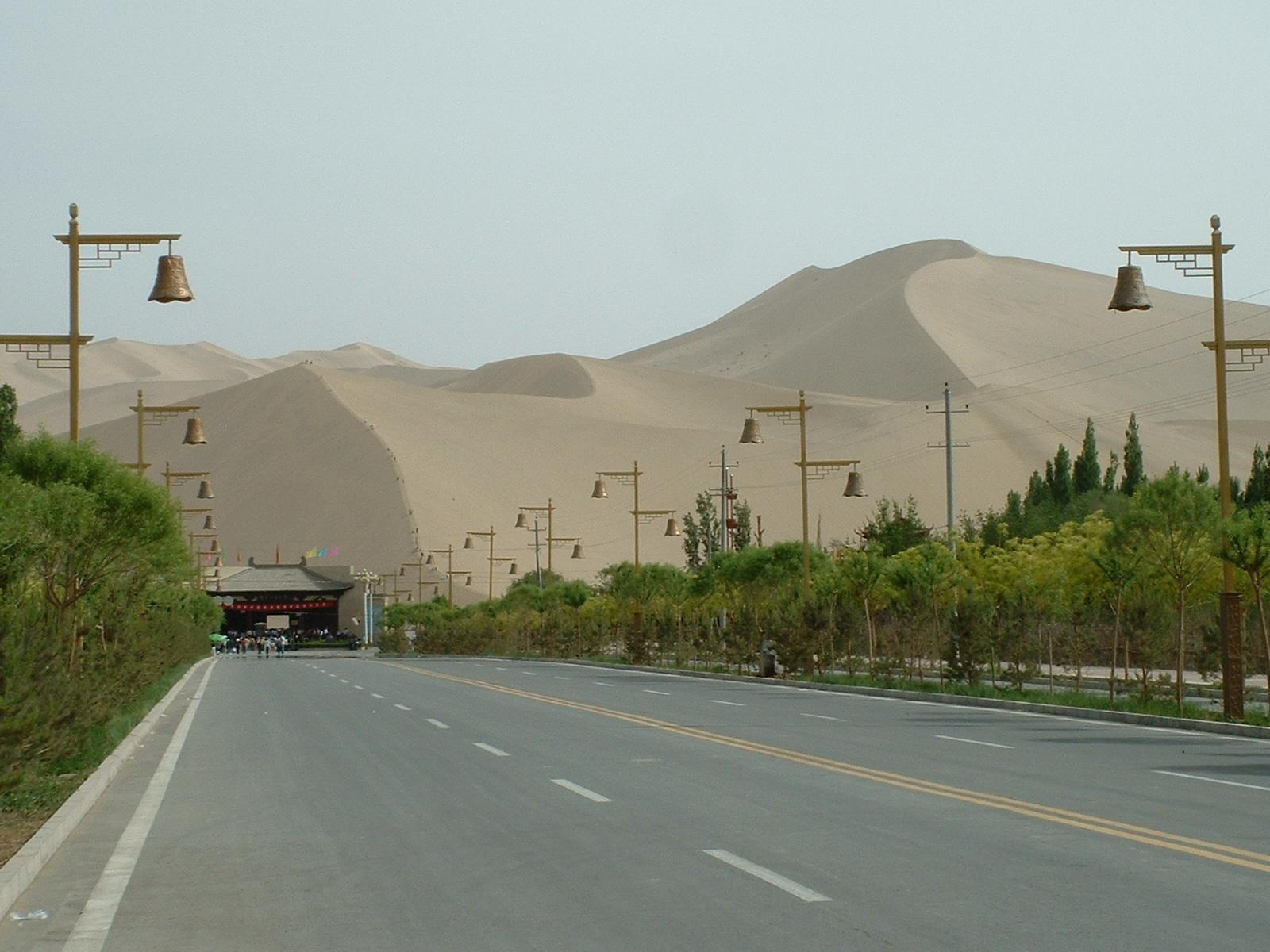
The "megadunes" near Dunhuang

"At the points where we measured them the northern terrace was 113 feet (34 m) high and the southern 853/4 feet....Both terraces belong to the same level, and would appear to correspond to the shore lines of a big bay of the last surviving remnant of the Central Asian Mediterranean. At the point where I crossed it the depression was 6 to 7 miles (11 km), wide, and thus resembled a flat valley or immense river-bed."

The moving sands of the Kumtag are of a concern for the designers of the Golmud–Dunhuang Railway, which will cross the eastern edge of this desert in the Shashangou area, between Dunhuang and the Altyn-Tagh-Qilian mountain system. There was a concern that the "megadunes" characteristic of this area may shift, burying the railway. However, geological research indicated that the "megadunes" are mostly formed by solid subsoil, rather than just sand. Although there is still the issue of drifting sand, it is thought by the experts that the sand is mostly blown along the direction of the future railway rather than across it, and can be handled with certain precautions.

== See also ==
- Taklamakan Desert
