= Xiaohe Cemetery =

Cemetery in Ruoqiang County, China

Xiaohe Tomb Complex
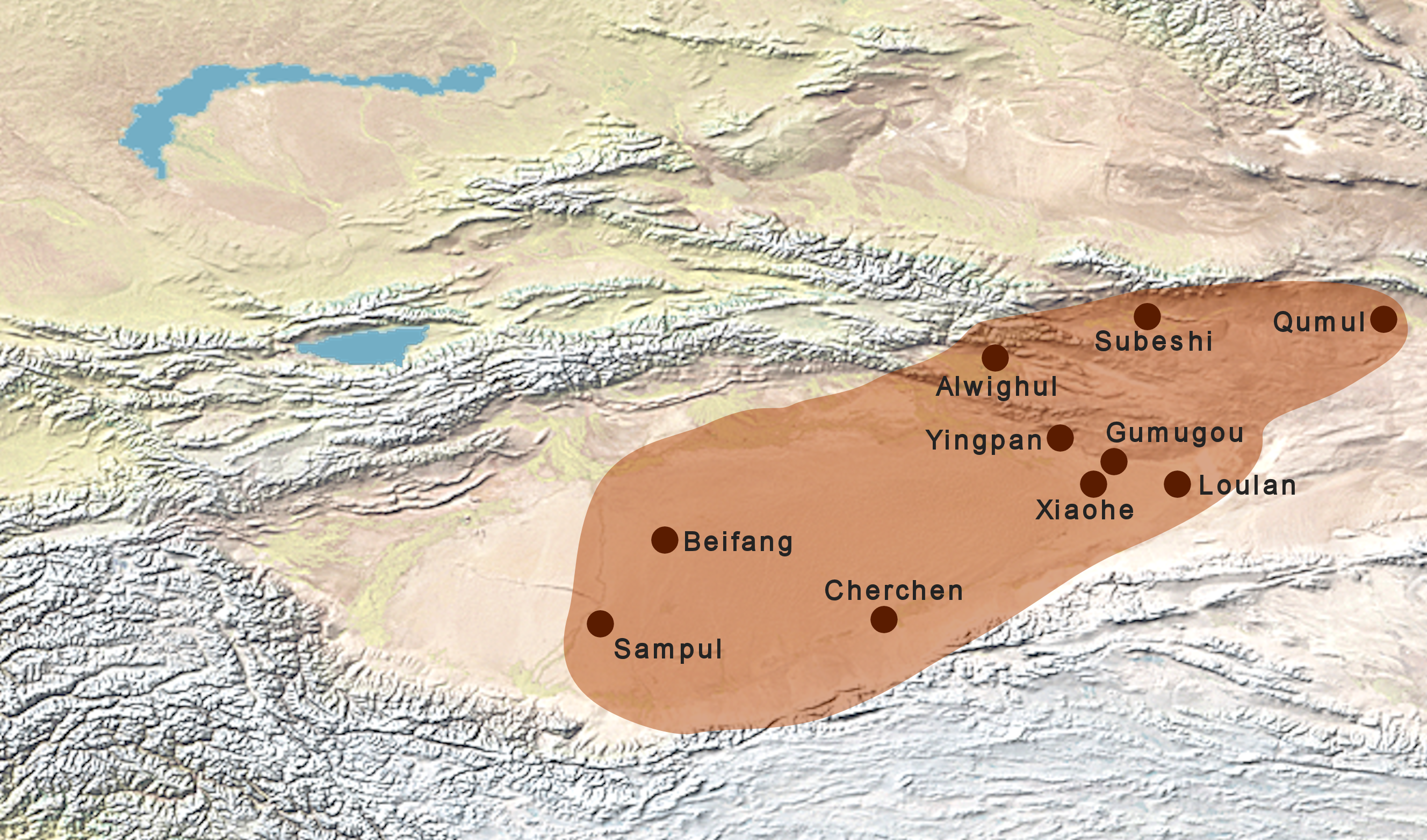
- The Tarim Basin, with the Taklamakan Desert, and the location of Xiaohe Cemetery

- Location of Xiaohe Tomb complex in China Xiaohe (China)
- 40.3364°N 88.6725°E
- Periods: 2000–1000 BCE
- Location: China
- Region: Xinjiang

The Xiaohe Cemetery (Chinese: 小河墓地; pinyin: Xiǎohé mùdì, lit. 'little river cemetery'), also known as Ördek's Necropolis, is a Bronze Age site located to the west of Lop Nur, in Xinjiang, Western China. It contains about 330 tombs, about 160 of which were looted by grave robbers before archaeological research could be carried out.

The Gumugou cemetery slightly to the north is also considered as part of the Xiaohe culture.

The cemetery resembles an oblong sand dune. From it the remains of more than 30 people, the earliest of whom lived around 4,000 years ago, have been excavated. The bodies, which have been buried in air-tight ox-hide bags, are so well-preserved that they have often been referred to as the "Tarim mummies".

The Xiaohe remains have attracted considerable attention, particularly because of their "Caucasoid" appearance. Analysis of the Xiaohe population's genetic makeup has revealed that they represented a genetic bottleneck, essentially derived from Ancient North Eurasians.

The Xiaohe cemetery complex contains the largest number of mummies found at any single site in the world to date. The bodies are likely to have been transported significant distances for burial at Xiaohe, as no contemporaneous settlement is known to have existed near the tomb complex.

== Archaeology ==
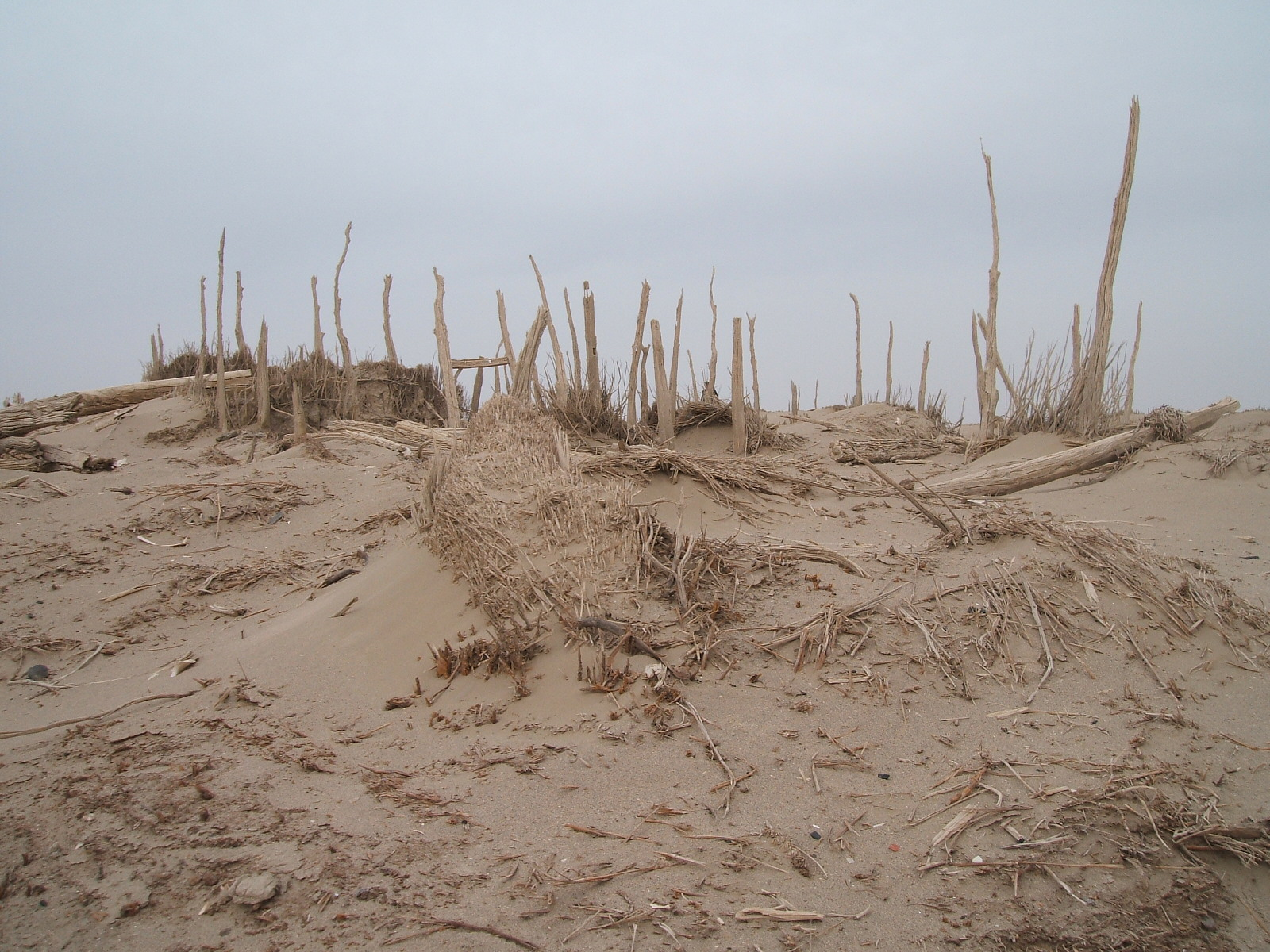
The site of the cemetery; the vertical posts indicate the tomb locations

=== Discovery and early excavations ===
A local hunter named Ördek found the site around 1910. Later, in 1934, with Ördek's help, Swedish explorer and archeologist Folke Bergman located the site which he named Xiaohe, "little river", after a nearby tributary of the Kaidu River. The tomb complex appeared as a small oval mound, and the top of the burial mound was covered with a forest of erect wooden posts whose tops had been splintered by strong winds. Oar-shaped wooden monuments and wooden human figures were found at the site. The coffins were assembled over the bodies which had become mummified. Bergman excavated 12 burials and recovered approximately 200 artifacts that were transported back to Stockholm. Bergman noted the surprising resemblance in the clothing, especially the fringed loin-cloths, to Bronze Age grave finds in Denmark, but dismissed any direct connection.

=== Later excavations ===
In October 2003, an excavation project, organized by the Xinjiang Cultural Relics and Archaeology Institute, began at the site. A total of 167 tombs have been uncovered since the end of 2002, and excavations have revealed hundreds of smaller tombs built in layers. In 2006, a coffin wrapped with ox hide in the shape of a boat was found. It contained a remarkably intact mummy of a young woman, which came to be called the Beauty of Xiaohe (or Beauty of Loulan).

=== Description of the tombs ===
Each tomb is marked by a vertical poplar post near the upper end of the coffin. A skull or horn of an ox may be suspended from the post. The ends of the posts can be either torpedo-shaped or oar-shaped, representing the phallus and vulva respectively. The male burials were marked with the oar-shaped posts, while the female burials were marked with the phallic posts. Bows and arrows were found with the male burials. The posts and coffins may be painted red. Each coffin is made of two massive pieces of plank assembled over the body, resembling an overturned boat, and then covered with cowhides. A few special tombs containing females have an extra rectangular coffin on top covered with layers of mud. Small masks of human faces and wooden human figures may accompany the burials. Twigs and branches of ephedra were placed beside the body.

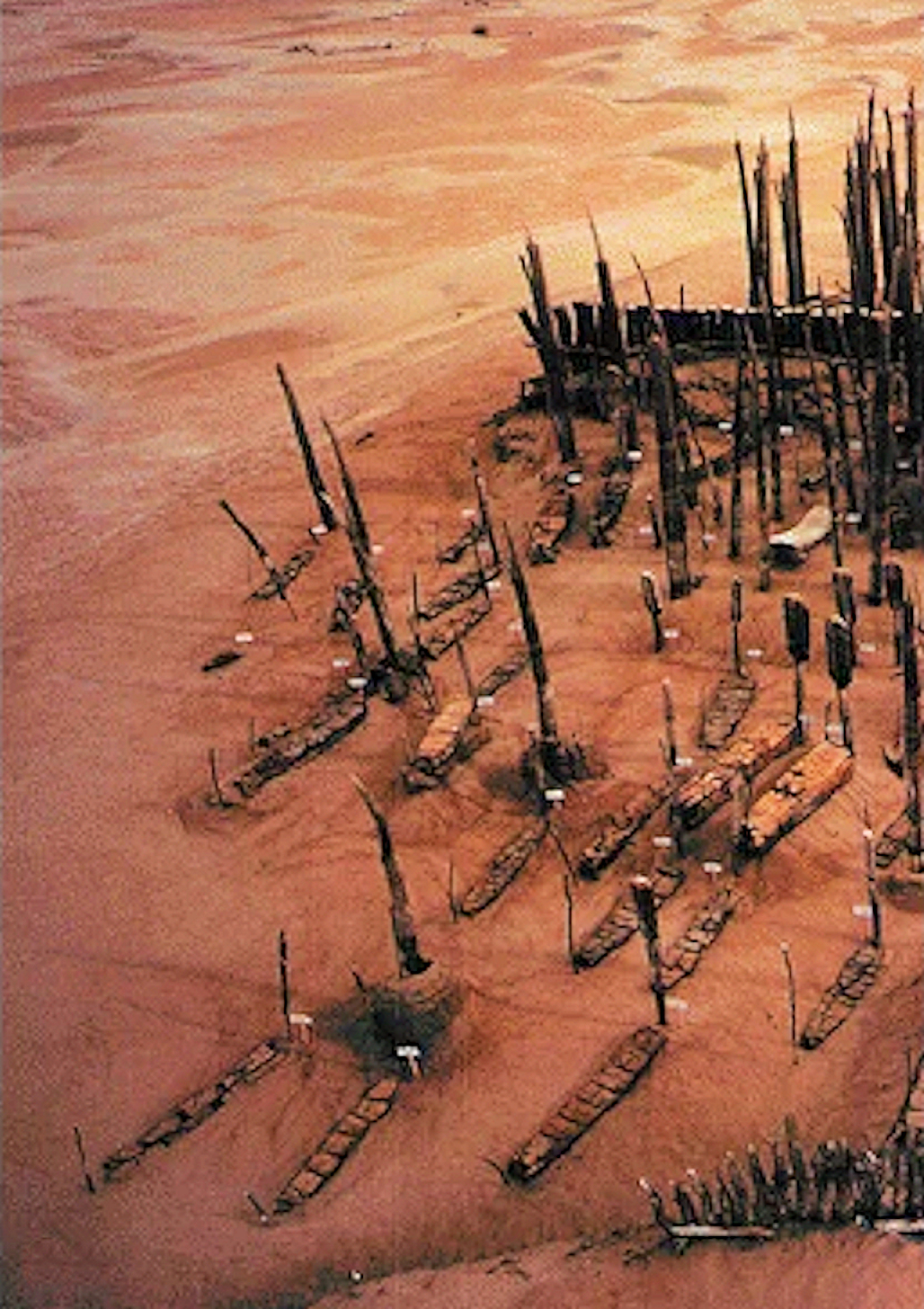
Xiaohe cemetery (fourth layer)

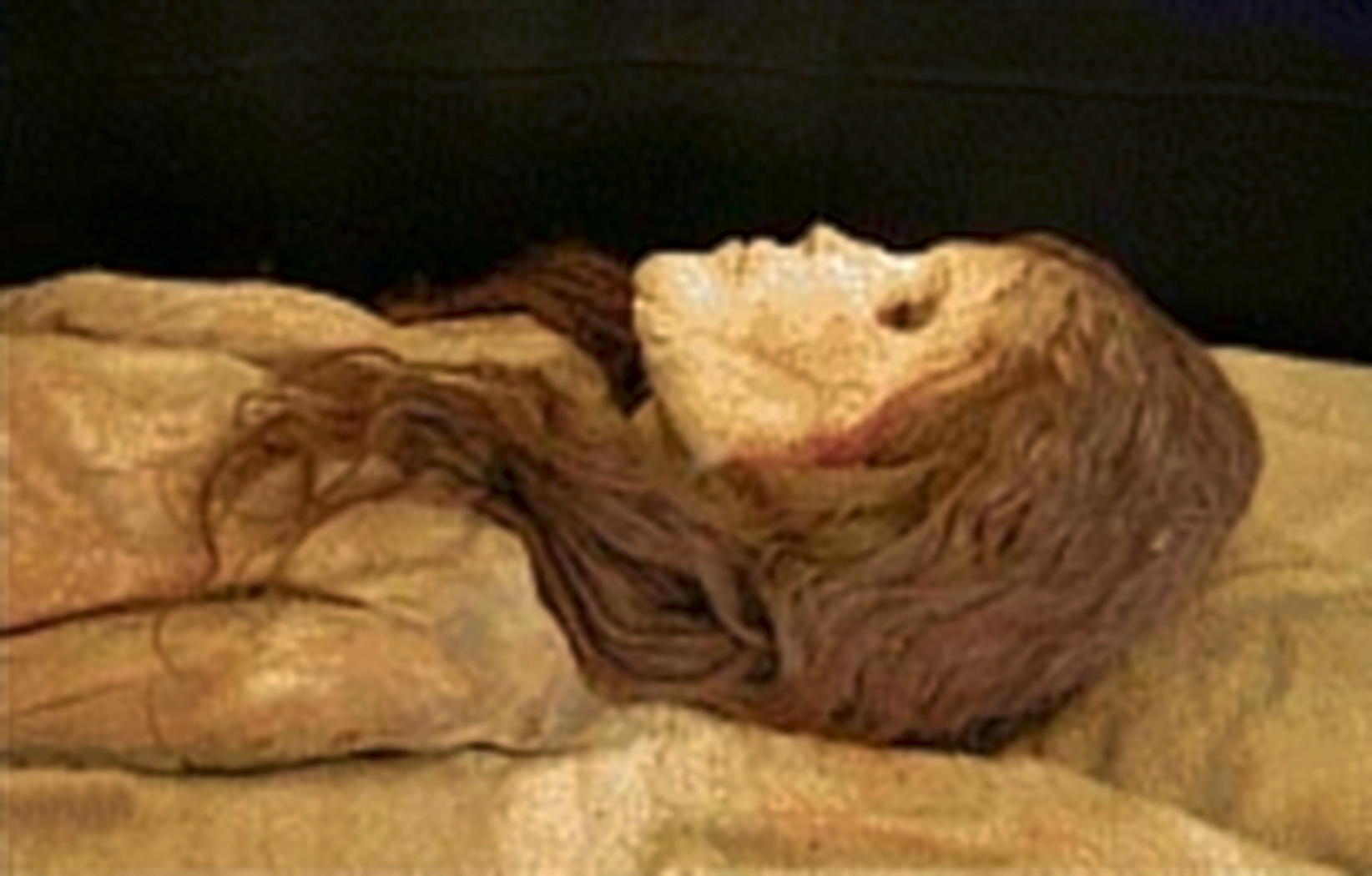
Xiaohe cemetery, the Princess of Xiaohe (female mummy with Western Eurasian features)

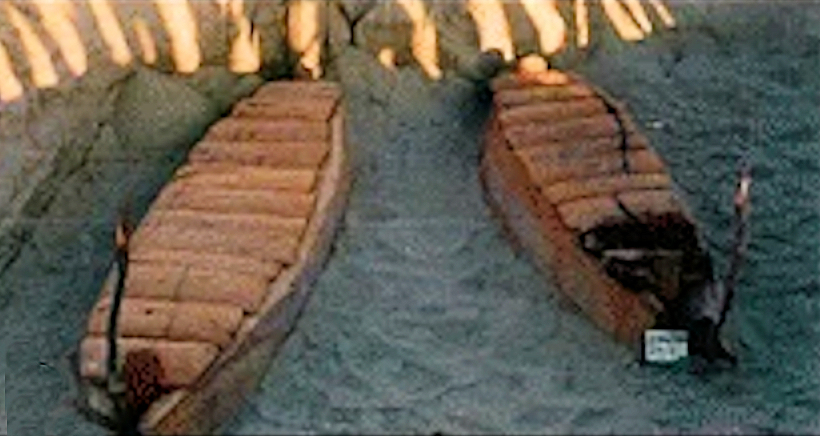
Xiaohe cemetery (boat coffins)

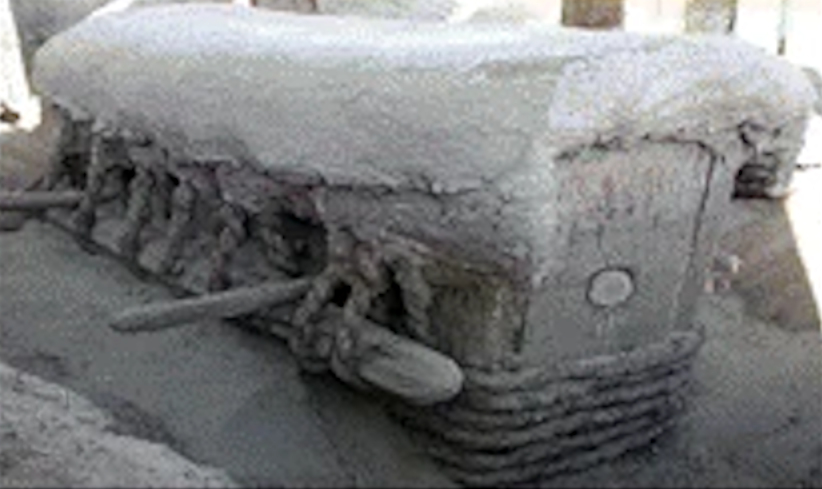
Xiaohe cemetery (double-layered coffin)

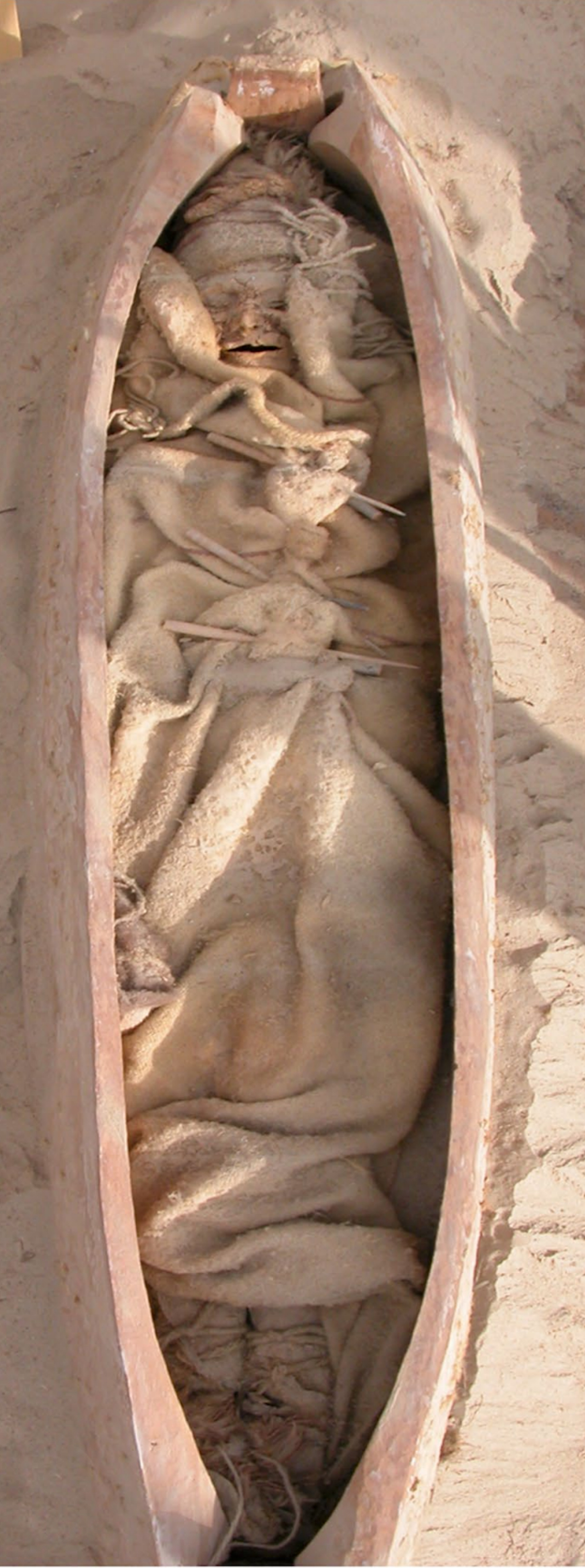
Burial XHM66 from Xiaohe cemetery, with boat-shaped coffin and mummified remains dressed in woollen garments

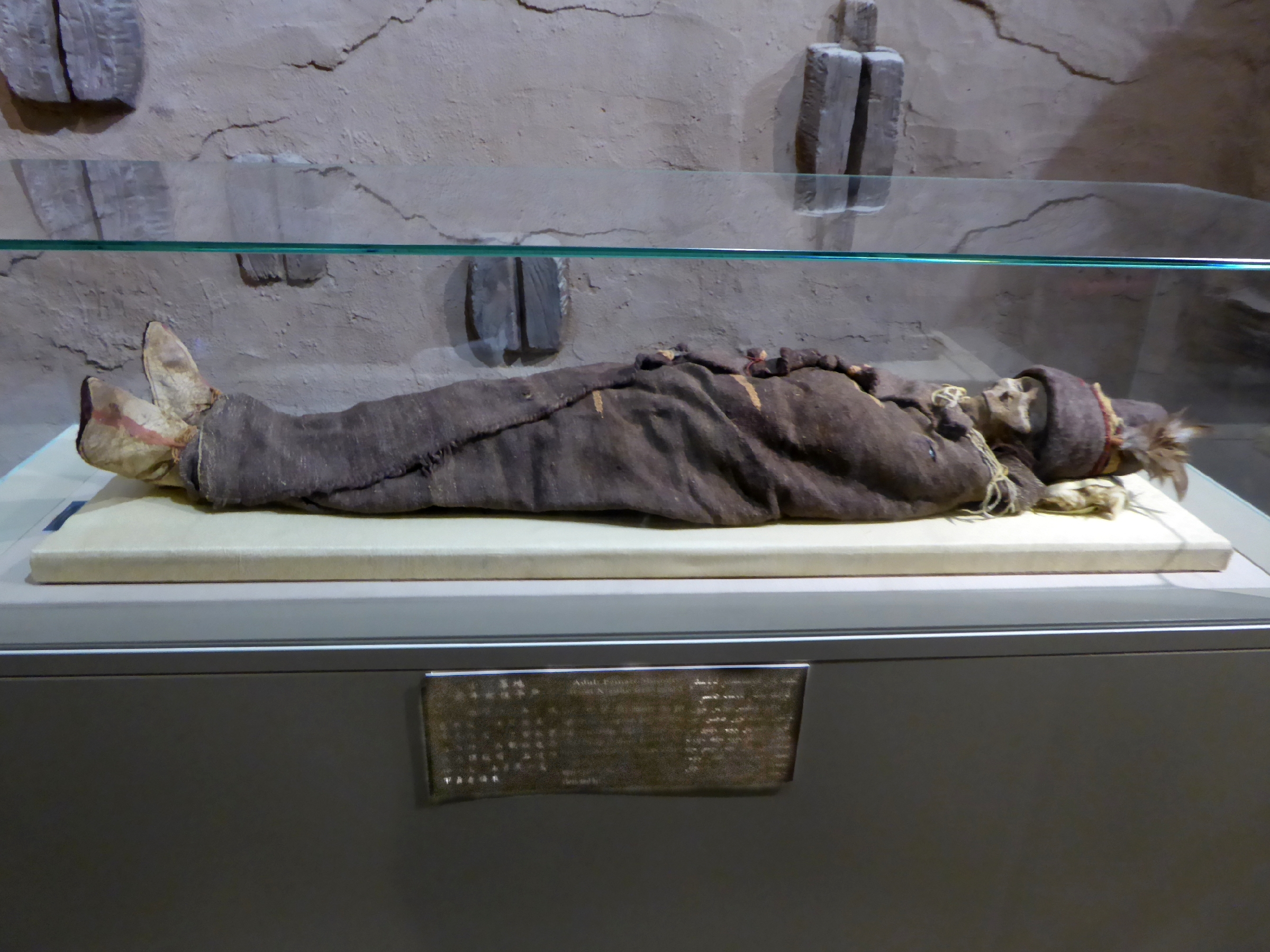
The Beauty of Xiaohe, Xinjiang Museum

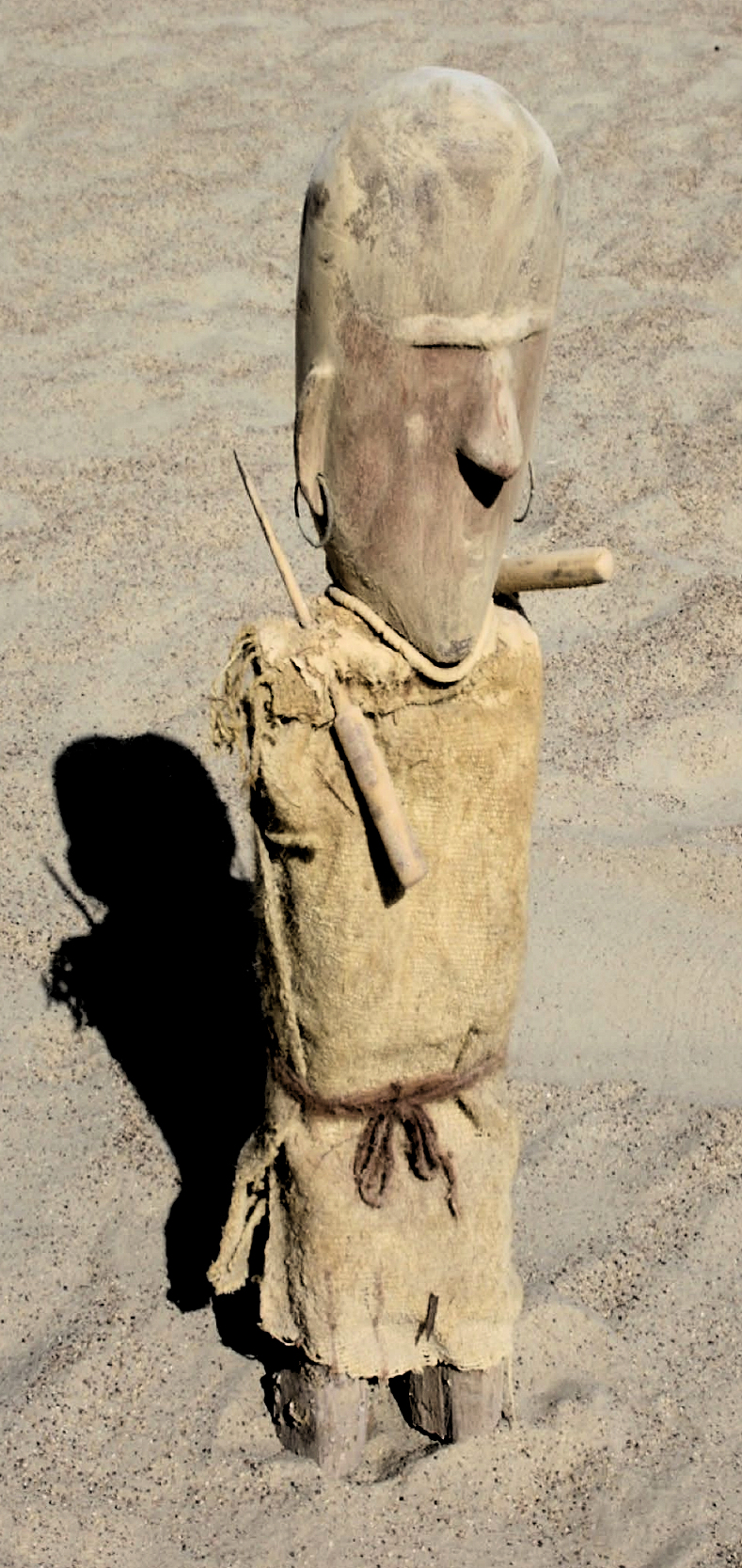
Wooden sculpture from Xiaohe cemetery

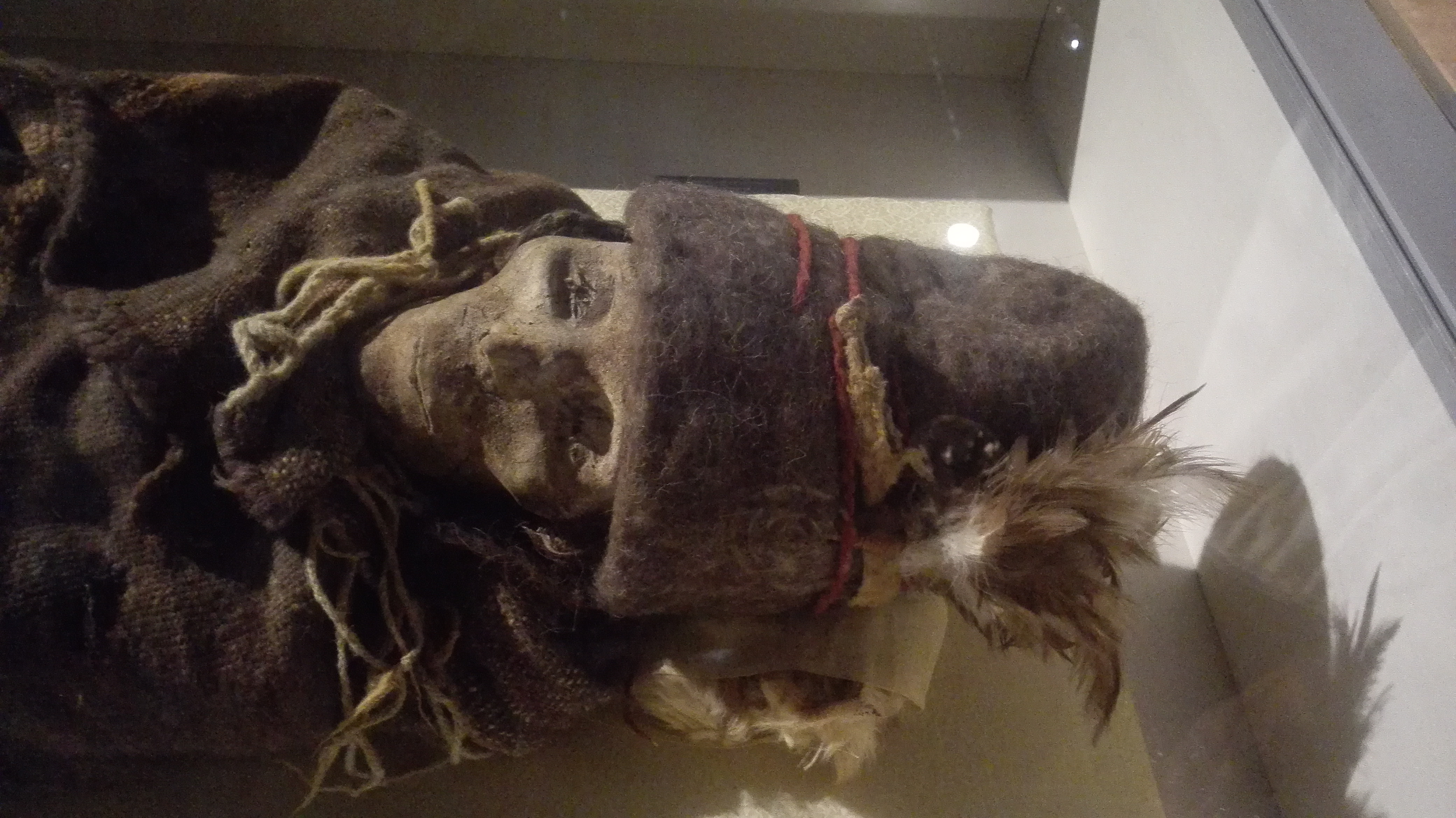
Xiaohe mummy

== Genetic studies ==
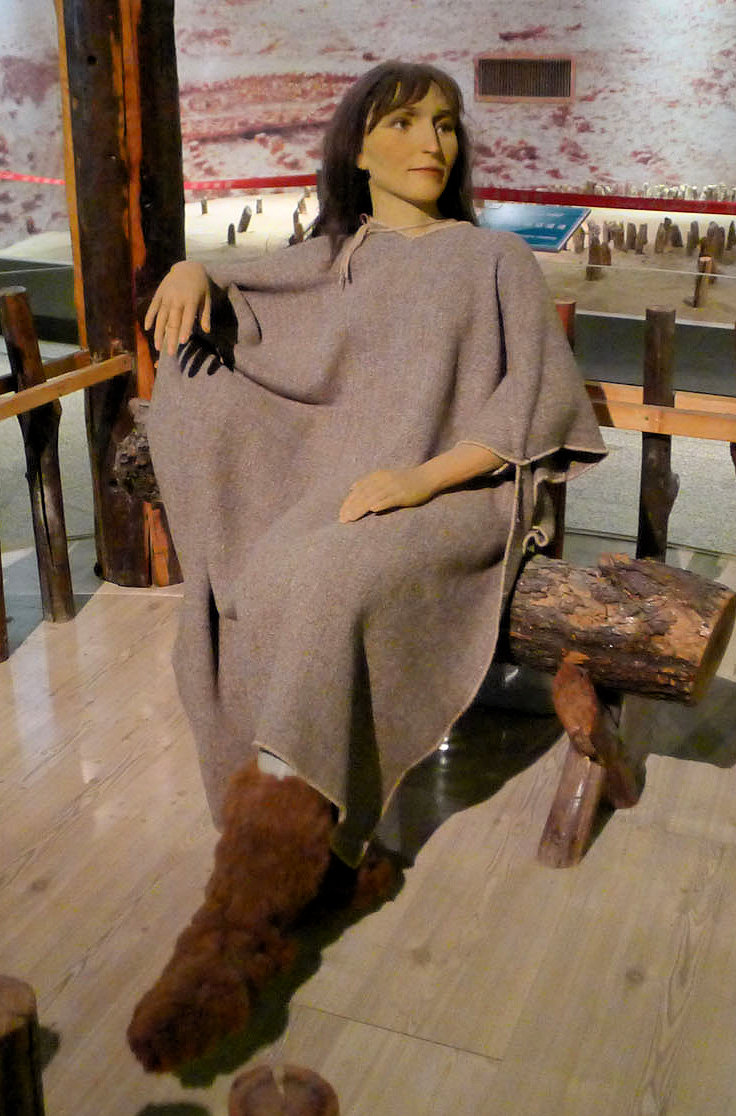
Reconstruction of a female individual from Xiaohe Cemetery, Xinjiang Museum

Between 2009 and 2015, the remains of 92 individuals found at the Xiaohe Tomb complex were analyzed for Y-DNA and mtDNA markers.

Genetic analyses of the mummies showed that the maternal lineages of the Xiaohe people originated from both East Asia and West Eurasia, whereas all of the paternal lineages had links to modern populations of West Eurasia.

Mitochondrial DNA analysis, which indicates direct maternal ancestry, showed that maternal lineages carried by the Xiaohe people include West Eurasian haplogroups H, K, U5, U7, U2e, T and R*; East Asian haplogroups B5, D and G2a; haplogroups of most likely Central Asian or East Asian origin C4 and C5; as well as typically South Asian haplogroups M5 and M*. On the other hand, nearly all (11 out of 12 - or around 92%) of surveyed paternal lines are of West Eurasian haplogroup R1a1, and one is of exceptionally rare basal paragroup K*. The geographic location of this admixing is unknown, although south Siberia is likely.

According to a comment posted on 18 July 2014 by Hui Zhou, one of study's co-authors, the Xiaohe R1a1 lineages belonged to a specifically European branch rather than the more common Central Asian R-Z93.

Fan Zhang et al. (2021) examined genomic data from five individuals dating to around 3000–2800 BC from the Dzungarian Basin and thirteen individuals dating to around 2100–1700 BC from the Tarim Basin, representing the earliest yet discovered human remains from North and South Xinjiang. Researchers found "the Early Bronze Age Dzungarian individuals exhibit a predominantly Afanasievo ancestry with an additional local contribution, and the Early–Middle Bronze Age Tarim individuals contain only a local ancestry. The Tarim individuals from the site of Xiaohe further exhibit strong evidence of milk proteins in their dental calculus, indicating a reliance on dairy pastoralism at the site since its founding. The results do not support previous hypotheses for the origin of the Tarim mummies, who were argued to be Proto-Tocharian-speaking pastoralists descended from the Afanasievo or to have originated among the Bactria–Margiana Archaeological Complex or Inner Asian Mountain Corridor cultures. Instead, although Tocharian may have been plausibly introduced to the Dzungarian Basin by Afanasievo migrants during the Early Bronze Age, the earliest Tarim Basin cultures appear to have arisen from a genetically isolated local population that adopted neighbouring pastoralist and agriculturalist practices, which allowed them to settle and thrive along the shifting riverine oases of the Taklamakan Desert."

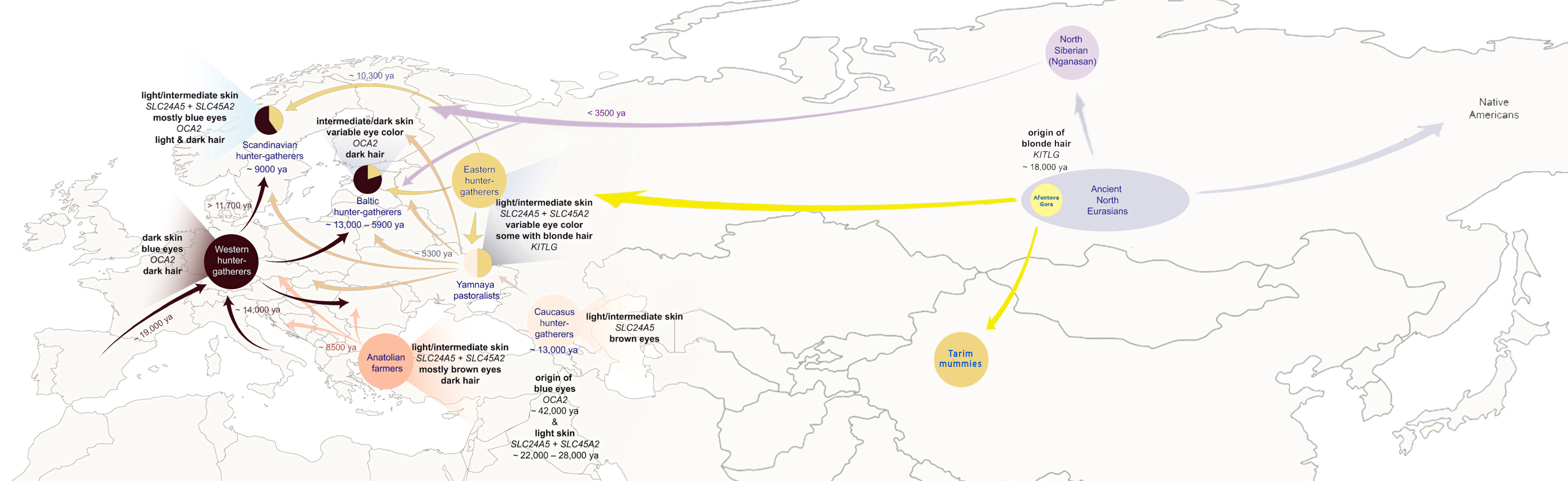
The mummies of the Xiaohe Cemetery were essentially derived from Ancient North Eurasian populations.

== See also ==
- List of Bronze Age sites in China
- Loulan Kingdom (Kroraina)
- Charklik
- Tarim mummies
- Niya
- Miran (China)
