= Daxihaizi Reservoir =

- Da Xihaizi Reservoir
- 大西海子水库
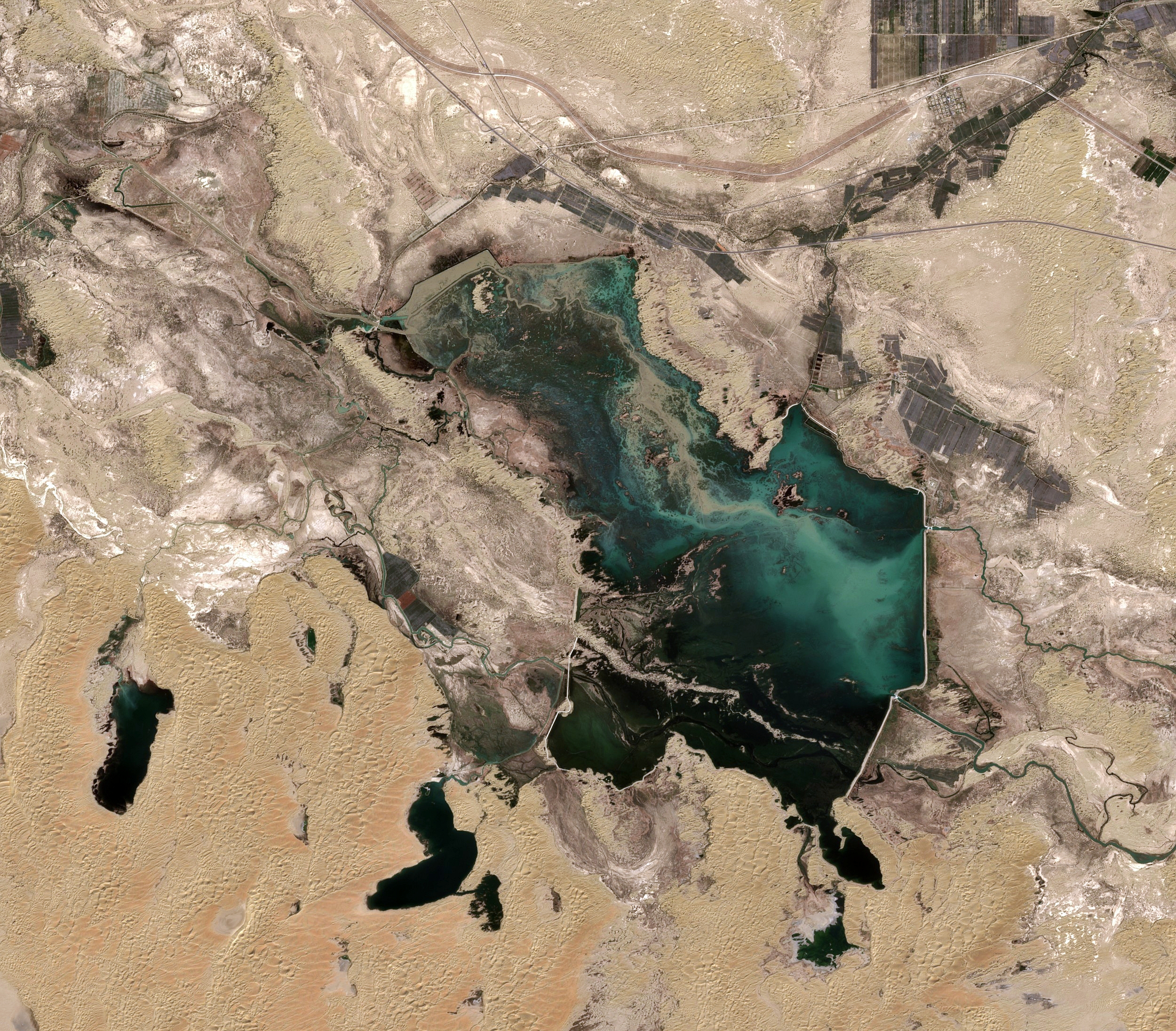
- Sentinel-2 image (2022)

- Location within Bayingolin
- Location: at the end of the Tarim River
- Coordinates: 40°34′18″N 87°31′13″E
- Type: reservoir
- Basin countries: China
- Built: 1972

Daxihaizi Reservoir (Chinese: 大西海子水库), also spelled Daxi Haizi Reservoir or Great West Sea Reservoir, is a reservoir at the very end of the Tarim River, 720 kilometres (450 mi) from Urumqi. To the west of the reservoir is the Taklamakan Desert. The reservoir has a storage area of 68 square kilometres (26 sq mi), a depth of 2–3 metres (6 ft 7 in – 9 ft 10 in), and a total storage capacity of 168 million cubic metres (5.9 billion cubic feet).

== History ==
In 1958, the soldiers of the Second Division of the Xinjiang Production and Construction Corps began to build the Daxihaizi Reservoir. In 1972, after the completion of the reservoir in the middle reaches of the Tarim River, the 320-kilometre (200 mi) section of the lower Tarim River dried up. In 1974, Taitema Lake completely dried up.

In 1993, the Daxihaizi Reservoir dried up completely for the first time in its history.

In 2012, the reservoir was withdrawn from the agricultural irrigation system, and became a purely ecological reservoir. In May 2014, the Daxihaizi Reservoir was officially transferred from the XPCC to the Tarim River Basin Bureau (塔里木河流域管理局).
