= Tarim River =

Tarim
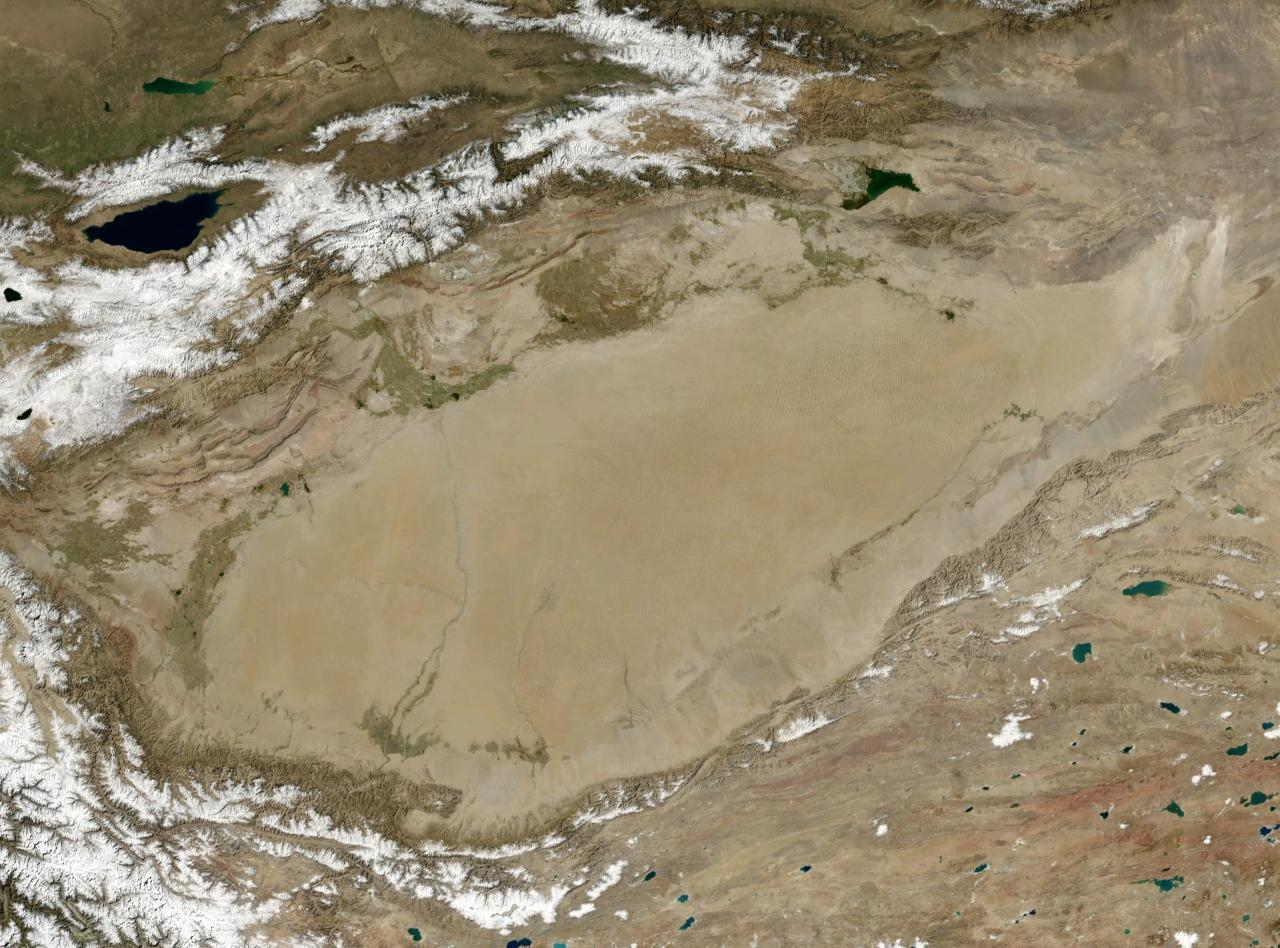

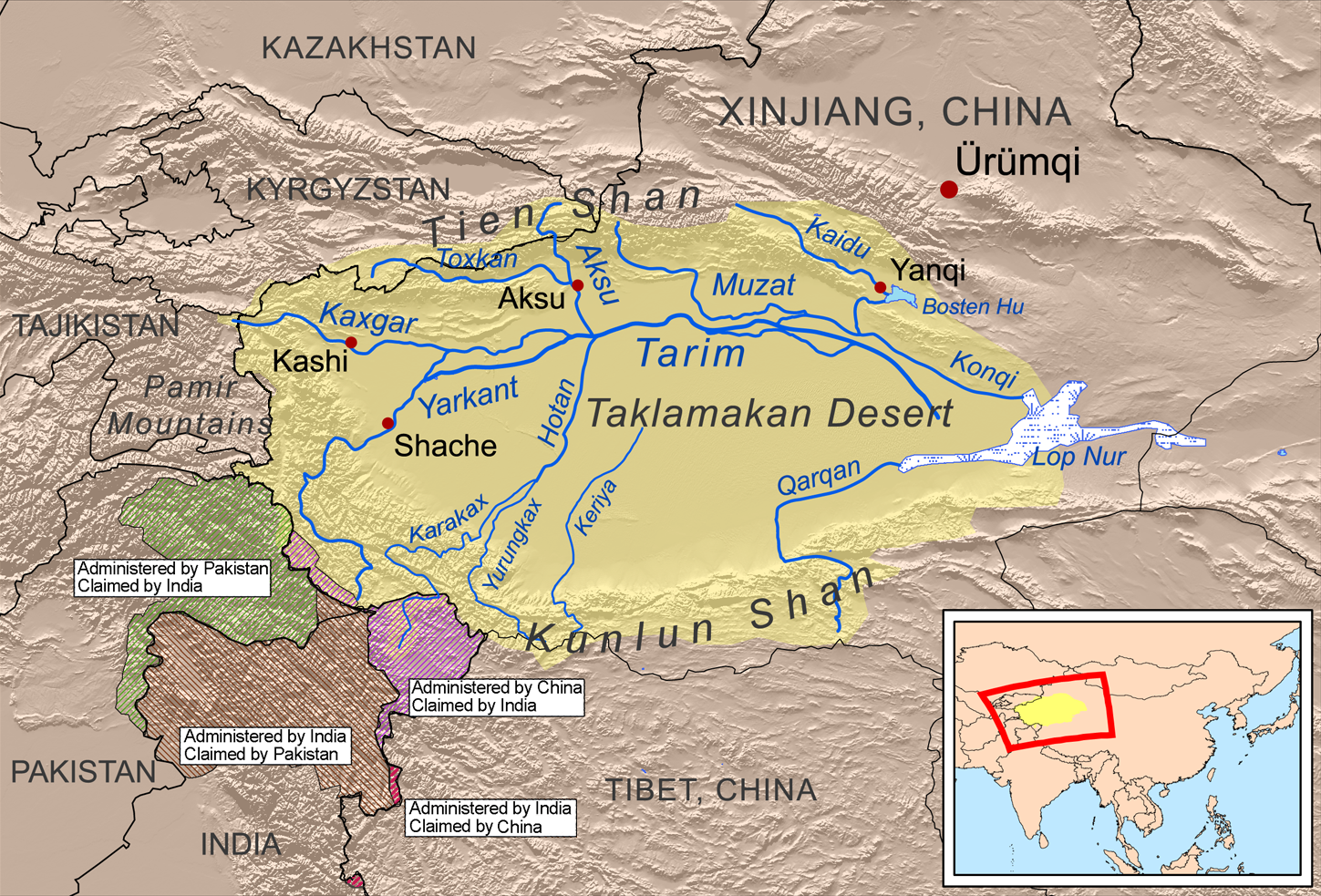
- Map showing the rivers of the Tarim Basin

Location
- Country: China
- Location: Xinjiang

Physical characteristics
- Source: confluence of Yarkand and Aksu
- Mouth: Taitema Lake
  - coordinates: 39°28′N 88°19′E
- Length: 1,321 km (821 mi)
- Basin size: 1,020,000 km^{2} (390,000 sq mi)

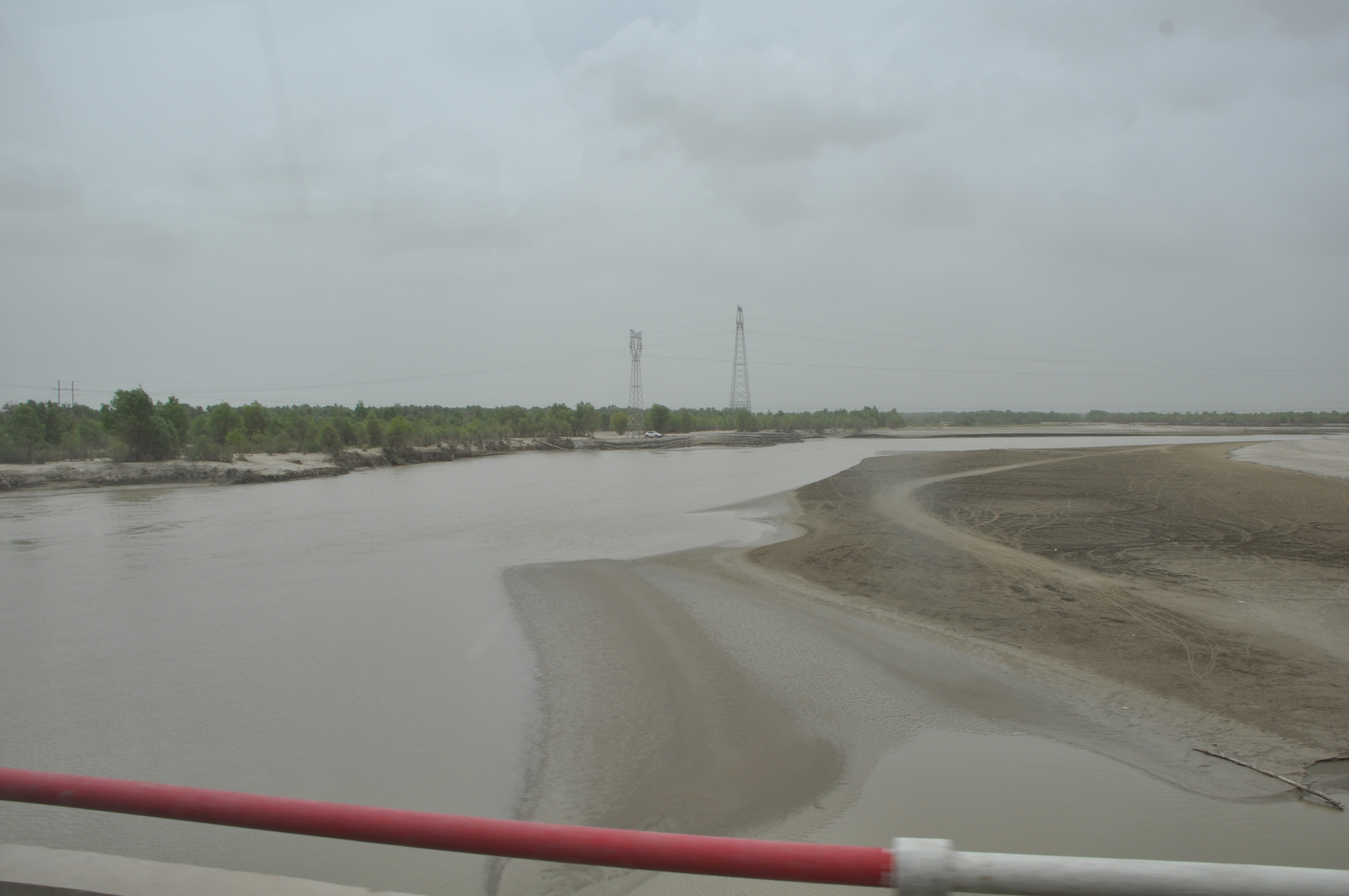
Crossing the Tarim River on Tarim Desert Highway (June 2012)

The Tarim River (Chinese: 塔里木河; pinyin: Tǎlǐmù Hé; Uyghur: تارىم دەرياسى, romanized: Tarim deryasi), known in Sanskrit as the Śītā, is an endorheic river in Xinjiang, China. It is the principal river of the Tarim Basin, a desert region of Central Asia between the Tian Shan and Kunlun Mountains. The river historically terminated at Lop Nur, but today reaches no further than Taitema Lake before drying out.

It is the longest inland river in China. The Tarim River originates from the Karakoram Mountains and flows into Lop Nur along the northern edge of the Taklimakan Desert. It has a total length of 2,327 kilometers and a drainage area of 1.02 million square kilometers. Its main tributaries include the Hotan River, the Aksu River, and the Kashgar River. The course of the Tarim River swings from north to south in history, and its migration is uncertain. The last major river change occurred in 1921, when the main stream was diverted to the east and flowed into Lop Nur through the Kongque River. In 1952, a dam was built near Yuli County, separated from the Kongque River, and the river water returned to Taitma Lake and Lop Nur through the old road of Tieganlik.

== Etymology ==
The Greek geographer Ptolemy in the 2nd century AD called the Tarim River the Oichardes River in his book "Geography". "Shui Jing Zhu" is called the South River. In the Northern dynasties, Sui and Tang dynasties, the Tarim River was called Ji-style water, Ji-shu water and Ji-shou water. The Qing dynasty's "Map of the Western Regions" called it "Erse Gol", which means "flowing water" in Mongolian. According to the "Draft of Qing History", the name of the river Tarim means "horse without reins", which describes the river's frequent diversion. In the 24th year of the reign of Emperor Jiaqing of the Qing dynasty (1819), Xu Song wrote in "The Record of the Waterways of the Western Regions": "The Hui language (Uyghur language) refers to the 'cultivable land' called Tarim, and it is said that the people living in the riverside are farming for their business." Sita River (Śita) is mentioned in ancient Indian and Buddhist geographical traditions as a northern river. The name has been explored in connection with the river systems of Central Asia. Historical trade routes and Buddhist journeys linked this region with India, facilitating exchanges of religious teachings, cultural traditions and geographical knowledge.

== Geography and climate ==
The total length of the Yarkand-Tarim river system is 2,030 kilometres (1,260 mi), although, as the Tarim frequently changes its channel, the length tends to vary over the years.

The river is shallow, unsuitable for navigation, and because of its heavy silt load, forms a braided stream near its terminus. The area of the Tarim River Basin is about 557,000 square kilometres (215,000 mi^{2}). A considerable part of the Tarim's course follows no clearly defined riverbed. The water volume of the lower course of the river diminishes as a result of extensive evaporation and water-diversion schemes.

The Tarim River Basin belongs to the inland river basin, which originates from the inland rivers in the mountains around the Tarim Basin and flows into the basin, forming a centripetal water system. The river system of this basin is composed of 144 rivers originating from the Tianshan Mountains, the Pamir Plateau, the Karakoram Mountains, the Kunlun Mountains and the Altun Mountains around the Tarim Basin. The river system comprises the Weigan river system, the Aksu river system, the Kashgar river system, the Yarkand river system, the Hotan river system, the Keriya river system, and the river system.

The water source of the Tarim River completely comes from the tributaries originating from the surrounding mountainous areas, and the sediment content is very high. The average annual water volume of the Tarim River at the confluence of the three major sources is 4.299 billion cubic meters, of which the Aksu River contributes 3.358 billion cubic meters, the Yeerqiang River 23 million cubic meters, and the Hotan River 918 million cubic meters. Downstream, 212 million cubic meters are introduced from the Kongque River, and the total water volume of the main stream is 4.511 billion cubic meters. At the same time, the amount of water varies greatly due to seasonal differences. In summer, snow and glaciers melt, which increases the amount of water and decreases in winter. The Tarim River is a naturally dissipative river in history, with an average annual water consumption of 1.669 billion cubic meters in the upper reaches, 2.296 billion cubic meters in the middle reaches, and only 633 million cubic meters of water entering the downstream. The distribution of glacier runoff is uneven throughout the year. The water inflow from June to September accounts for 70%-80% of the annual runoff, and most of them are floods; the irrigation season from March to May only accounts for about 10% of the annual runoff. is likely to cause spring drought.

Precipitation in the Tarim Basin is extremely scant, and in some years it is nonexistent. In the Taklamakan Desert and in the Lop Nur basin, the average annual total of precipitation is about 12 millimetres (0.47 in). In the foothills and in several other areas of the river's basin, the precipitation amounts to from 50 to 100 millimetres (2.0 to 3.9 in) a year. In the Tian Shan it is much wetter, precipitation often exceeding 510 millimetres (20 in). Maximum temperatures in the Tarim Basin are about 40 °C (104 °F). The Tarim River freezes over every year from December through March.

== Course ==
The Tarim River and most of its tributaries originate in the Karakorum and Kunlun Mountains. The name Tarim is applied to the river formed by the union of the Aksu River, flowing from the north, and Yarkand River, coming from the southwest, near the Aral City in western Xinjiang. A third river, the Khotan River, comes to the same junction area from the south but it is usually dry at this location, having crossed the Taklamakan Desert to get here. Another river of western Xinjiang is the Kashgar River, which flows into the Yarkand River during the rainy season about 37 kilometres (23 mi) upstream from the Yarkand's confluence with the Aksu.

The main source is the Yarkand River, which originates from the southeastern foot of Mount Telim Kanli in the Karakoram Mountains. The source is divided into four branches, namely the Yeerqiang River, the Aksu River, the Kashgar River, and the Hotan River. The four rivers converge near Xiaojia in Awati County. In the "Heyuan Jilue" of the Qing dynasty, it is recorded as "the meeting place is connected by four rivers. Shaped like a bullpen." Xiao Jacket is hereinafter referred to as the Tarim River. According to the calculation of the main source Yeerqiang River, the total length is 2327 kilometers. The main stream winds from west to east along the northern edge of the Tarim Basin at 41 degrees north latitude, and turns eastward to the southeast at 87 degrees east longitude, passing through the eastern part of the Taklimakan Desert, and finally injecting into Lop Nur, with a drainage area of 1.02 million. square kilometer. The main stream of the Tarim River is divided into upper, middle and lower sections: the section above Yangji Baza is the upper section, where the river bed is not bifurcated, the side erosion is strong, the meandering flow is developed, and the river bed is unstable; the middle section from Yangji Baza to Qunke, There are many forks, lakes and swamps here. During the flood period, the water flow overflows and disperses, and the main flow is often diverted; the lower section below Qunke, the river channel is restored and unified. The Daxihaizi Reservoir was built between Tieganlik, so only a small amount of river water now flows to Yingsu, and only during the flood period can water leak into Taitma Lake.

The Tarim flows in an eastward direction along the northern edge of the Taklamakan Desert. It receives another tributary, the Muzat River from the north; however, out of these four rivers (Aksu, Yarkand, Khotan, and Muzart), only the Aksu flows into the Tarim year-round It is the Tarim's most important tributary, supplying 70–80 percent of its water volume. Prior to the completion of reservoirs and irrigation works in the mid-20th century, the Tarim's waters eventually reached Lop Nur (now a salt-encrusted lake bed). The river's waters now drain intermittently into Taitema Lake, which is located about 160 kilometres (99 mi) southwest of Lop Nur.

== Flora and fauna ==
Vegetation in the Tarim Basin is mainly located along the river and its branches. There, at the edge of the sands, shrubs like vegetation and stunted trees, especially wormwood, are found. Tugay poplar forest grows in the Tarim River valley. Underbrush consists of willows, sea buckthorn, and dense growths of Indian hemp and Ural licorice.The river is rich in fish, and animal life on the river and the surrounding desert is varied. At the time of Sven Hedin's visit in 1899, tigers were still being hunted and trapped along the rivers of the region and near Lop Nur. The valley and lakes of the Tarim are a stopover for many migratory birds.

The Tarim River is frequently diverted, the river has a large sediment content, and the erosion and deposition change frequently. The Tarim River Basin is a corridor-like distribution of the largest primitive Populus euphratica forest in the world. There are many sandy plants such as Haloxylon, licorice, tamarisk and camel thorn in the forest. Hundreds of wild animals such as Tarim red deer, wild Bactrian camels, goose-throated antelopes, whooper swans and egrets are raised. At present, the Populus euphratica forest belt in the lower reaches is disappearing continuously due to the cut-off of the Tarim River and the decrease of water volume. The Tarim River flows through the desert area, and the riverbed is generally silt and sandy loam, which is easily washed away. The upper and middle reaches of the river bed are generally more than 1 km wide, the widest is nearly 4 km, and the downstream river bed is generally 200–300 meters wide. The Tarim River is a primitive river with few dikes along the river, and it is allowed to overflow during flood periods. Wild plants grow densely in the floodplain area, including Populus euphratica, red willow (the local common name for various species of Tamarix), and various pastures. In the middle reaches of the river, the terrain is gentle and there are many depressions, the water flow is scattered, interspersed with each other, the water network is disordered, the meanders are developed, and the water and grass lakes are connected.

== Human use ==
The water quality at the outflow mountain pass of the four major sources of the Tarim River is grade 1-2, which can meet the requirements of living, agricultural irrigation and fishery. Due to the influence of geographical environment factors and farmland drainage, the water quality of the main stream is poor in non-flood seasons, and the salinity of the river water has exceeded the standard of saline-alkali areas, and the water quality category is inferior to 5. Floods generally occur in summer, and the period from May to September in high mountains is the period of melting snow in glaciers and high mountains. The annual average natural runoff of the Tarim River Basin is 39.83 billion cubic meters, mainly recharged by glaciers and snowmelt, the unique groundwater resources are 3.07 billion cubic meters, and the total water resources in the basin is 42.9 billion cubic meters. Since the 1950s, the natural runoff of the four major source and outflow mountain passes has shown an increasing trend. However, due to the increase in the irrigation area and water consumption in front of the source area, the amount of water supplied to the main stream of the Tarim River has decreased from 6 billion cubic meters in the 1950s to The 4.4 billion cubic meters at the beginning of the 21st century have decreased by an average of 320 million cubic meters per decade. From the 1980s to the beginning of the 21st century, the amount of water entering the Tarim River has been less than the average for many years.

Since the 1950s, although the natural inflow of water in each tributary has increased, due to the continuous increase in water consumption in the source area and the upper and middle reaches of the main stream, the water source of each tributary in the upper reaches of the Tarim River has decreased, and the Kashgar River stopped inflow in the late 1950s; after the construction of the Bachu Xiaohaizi Reservoir in the 1960s, the discharge of the Yarkand River decreased sharply. Except for the discharge of the Hetian River during the flood period, there was no water discharge in other periods. In the upper reaches of the lower reaches, the five farms of the Second Agricultural Division of the Production and Construction Corps rely on the sluices that block the river to bring all the water into the plains and reservoirs. As a result, the lower reaches of the lower reaches have become a desert. Taitma Lake is seasonally dry, and Lop Nur is completely dry. Since 2001, "ecological water supply" has been regularly implemented downstream to partially restore and maintain the downstream vegetation and ecological environment.

== History ==
Some Chinese originally considered the Tarim to be the upper course of the Yellow River but, by the time of the Former Han dynasty (125 BCE–23 CE), it was known that it drains into Lop Nur, a series of salt lakes.

== See also ==
- Geography of China
- List of rivers of China
- Ruo Shui
- Shule River

== Suggested reading ==
- Baumer, Christoph. 2000. Southern Silk Road: In the Footsteps of Sir Aurel Stein and Sven Hedin. White Orchid Books. Bangkok.
- Bealby, John Thomas (1911). "Tarim" . Encyclopædia Britannica. Vol. 26 (11th ed.). pp. 427–428.
- Mallory, J.P. and Mair, Victor H. 2000. The Tarim Mummies: Ancient China and the Mystery of the Earliest Peoples from the West. Thames & Hudson. London.
