= Taitema Lake =

Chinese lake

Coordinates: 39°28′29″N 88°17′54″E

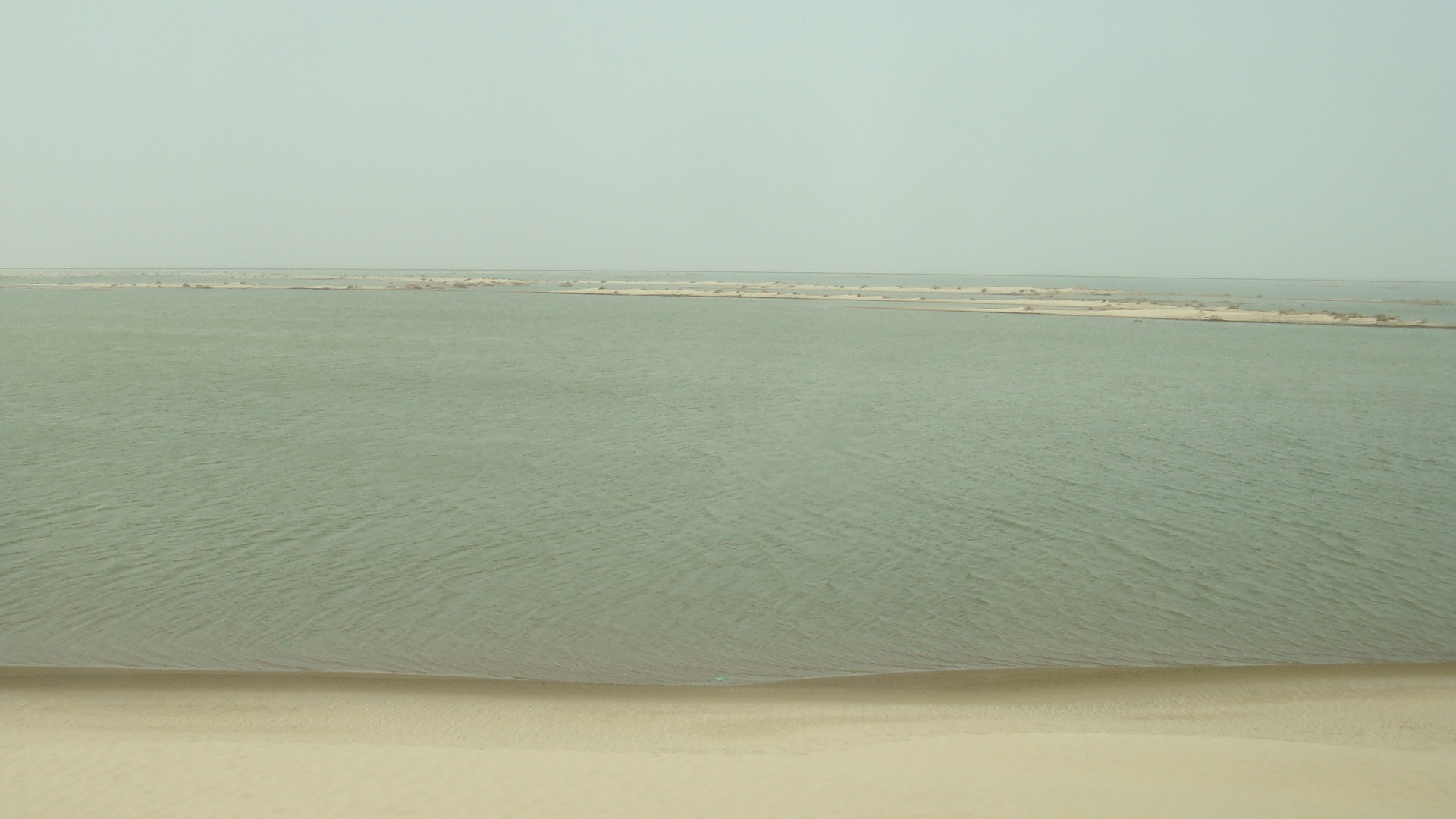
Taitema Lake in Xinjiang Uyghur Autonomous Region

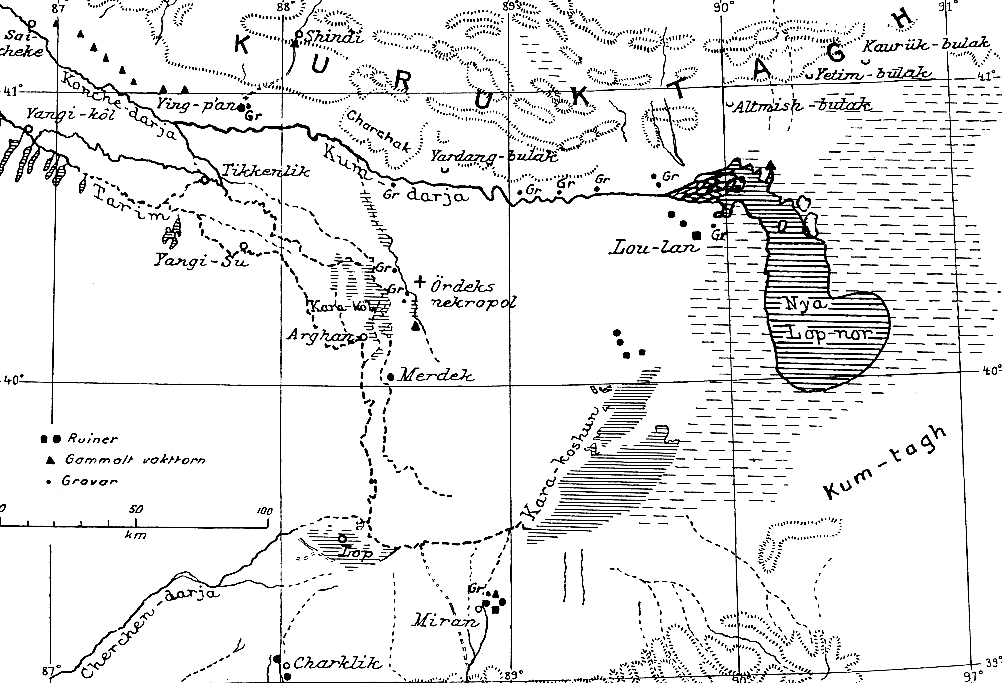
The 1939 Map by Folke Bergman

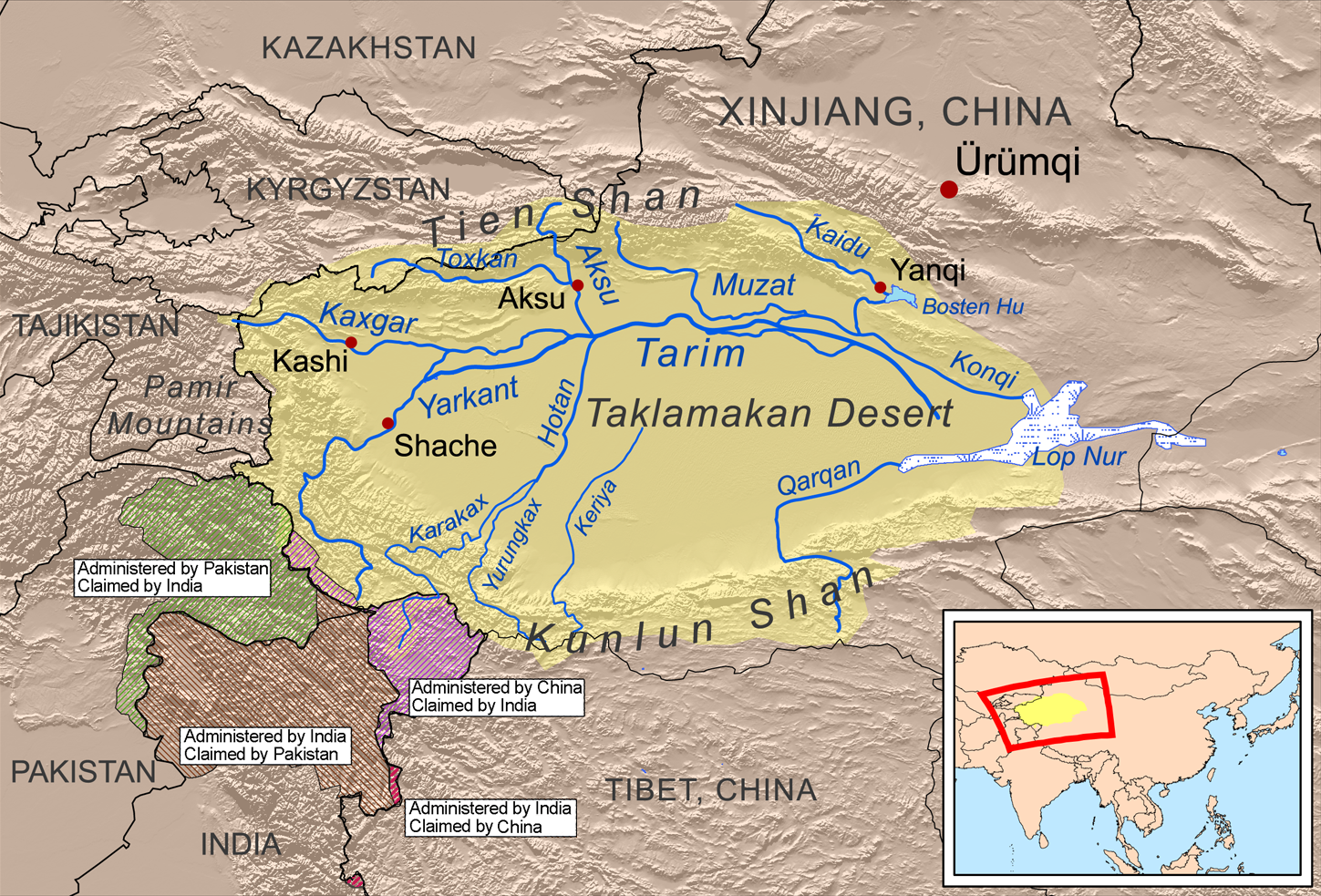
The Rivers in the Tarim Basin of the Taklamakan Desert

Taitema Lake (Chinese: 台特玛湖) is an endorheic lake in Ruoqiang County, Bayingolin Mongol Autonomous Prefecture, southeast of the Tarim Basin, Xinjiang Uyghur Autonomous Region, People's Republic of China. It is located in the northern part of Ruoqiang County, and is one of the three main depressions of that area, the other two being Karakoshun Lake (喀拉库顺湖) and Lop Nur.

For about 1,500 years before 1921, the Tarim River poured into Taitema Lake from north, the Qiemo River from southwest, and the lake water overflowed southward into Karakoshun Lake and then entered Lop Nur from south.

In 1959, the area of Taitema Lake was 183 square kilometers. However, Lake Taitema completely dried up by 1974.

Since 2010, a large amount of water from the Qiemo River, which originates from the Kunlun Mountains, created Taitema Lake of about 300 square kilometers. The current water source of Taitema Lake is mainly from the Qiemo.

== Transport ==
- Xinjiang Region Highway S235 (China National Highway 315 to Hami)

== See also ==
- Lop Nur
- Tarim Basin
