= Folke Bergman =

Swedish explorer and archaeologist

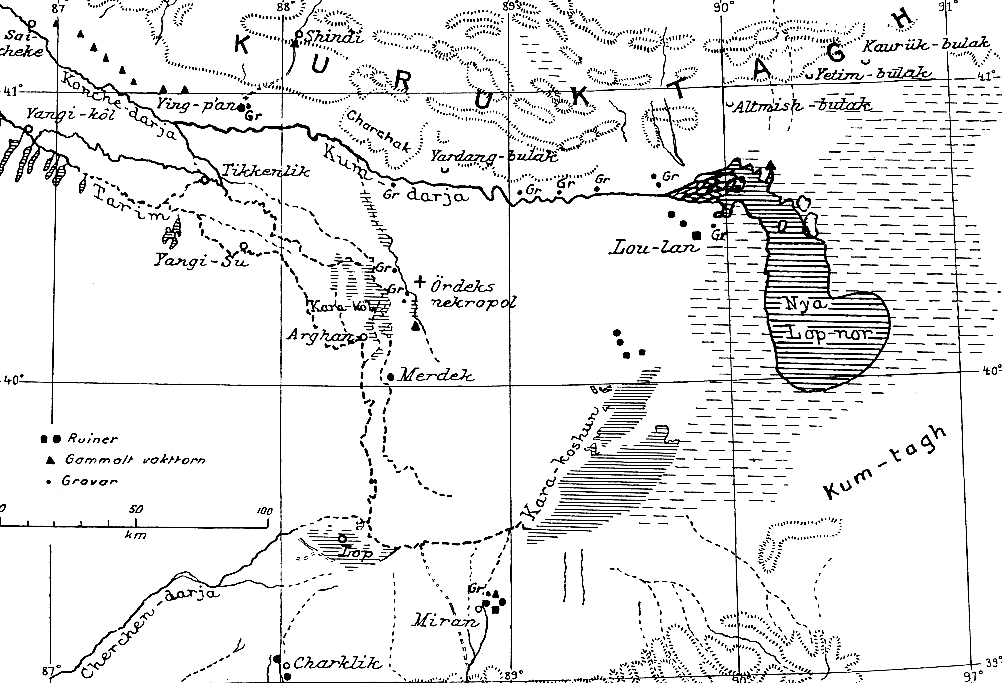
:Map of the Lop Nor region by Folke Bergman (1935)

Folke Bergman (29 August 1902 — 22 May 1946) was a Swedish explorer and archaeologist.

== Biography ==
Hans Folke Bergman was born at Klara parish in Stockholm, Sweden. He participated in the 1924–1926 excavations of Stora Torget in Visby. From 1929–1935, he participated in the Sino-Swedish Expedition as a member of the Sino-Swedish Northwest China Scientific Inspection Team led by Sven Hedin (1865-1952). He is best known for his discovery of the Xiaohe Tomb complex in Lop Nur, China during 1934. Another of his finds, the Juyan bamboo strips of the Han dynasty, zh:居延漢簡 (Inner Mongolia, 1930), is known for its transportation from Beiping to Hong Kong, then to the USA, and finally to Taiwan, in a preservation effort during the Sino-Japanese war.

== Literature ==
=== Primary ===
- Folke Bergman: Archäologische Funde. In: Petermanns Geographische Mitteilungen 1935, Gotha 1935, Seiten 292-293.
- Folke Bergman: Lou-Lan Wood-Carvings and Small Finds Discovered by Sven Hedin. In: Bulletin of the Museum of Far Eastern Antiquities 7 (1935), S. 71-144.
- Folke Bergman: Archaeological Researches in Sinkiang. Especially in the Lop-Nor Region. (Reports from the Scientific Expedition to the Northwestern Provinces of China under the Leadership of Dr. Sven Hedin / Scientific Expedition to the North-Western Provinces of China: Publication 7). Thule, Stockholm 1939 (englisch; das grundlegende Werk über die damaligen archäologischen Funde in der Wüste Lop Nor mit wichtigem Kartenmaterial; dieses Werk wurde erst um das Jahr 2000 in die chinesische Sprache übersetzt und ist dann für die chinesische Archäologie in Xinjiang bedeutsam geworden).
- Sven Hedin und Folke Bergman: History of an Expedition in Asia 1927–1935. Reports: Publication 24 - 4 : Part II 1928 - 1933 Statens Etnografiska Museum, Stockholm 1943.
- Sven Hedin und Folke Bergman: History of an Expedition in Asia 1927–1935. Reports: Publication 25: Part III 1933-1935, Statens Etnografiska Museum, Stockholm 1944.
- Folke Bergman: Travels and Archaeological Field-work in Mongolia and Sinkiang: a Diary of the Years 1927-1934. In: Sven Hedin und Folke Bergman: History of an Expedition in Asia 1927–1935. Part IV: 1933–1935. General reports, travels and field-work. (Reports: Publication 26.), Statens Etnografiska Museum, Stockholm 1945.
- Johannes Maringer und Folke Bergman: Contribution to the prehistory of Mongolia : A study of the prehistoric collections from inner Mongolia. (Reports: Publication 34 = 7, 7.) Thule, Stockholm 1950.
- Bo Sommarström: Archaeological researches in the Edsen-gol region, Inner Mongolia. Together with the catalogue prepared by Folke Bergman. Statens Etnografisk Museum, Stockholm 1956–1958. 2 Bde. (Reports … Publication 39. VII, 8–9.)
- Folke Bergman: The Kansu-Hohsi Corridor and the Suloho-Ochinaho drainage regions. (Reports: Publication 50 : 1, Geography; 4, Sven Hedin Central Asia atlas : memoir on maps; Vol. 3, Fasc. 3) Etnografiska Museet, The Sven Hedin Foundation, Stockholm 1980.

=== Secondary ===
- Hedin, Sven: Central Asia atlas, Stockholm, Statens etnografiska museum, Stockholm 1966. In diesem Atlas sind die Reiserouten der Expeditionsteilnehmer eingetragen. Siehe dazu: Hedin, Sven: Zum Zentralasien-Atlas und Haack, Hermann: Sven Hedins Zentralasien-Atlas. In: Petermanns Geographische Mitteilungen, 87. Jahrgang 1941, Seite 1 bis 7, Verlag Justus Perthes, Gotha.
- V. H. Mair: The rediscovery and complete excavation of Ördek's Necropolis. In: Journal of Indo-European Studies 34, 2006, Heft 3/4, S. 273–318 (Grundlegender Grabungsbericht in englischer Sprache).
- Alfried Wieczorek und Christoph Lind: Ursprünge der Seidenstraße. Sensationelle Neufunde aus Xinjiang, China. Ausstellungskatalog der Reiss-Engelhorn-Museen, Mannheim. Theiss, Stuttgart 2007. ISBN 3-8062-2160-X (Neue Funde auf den Grabungsstätten von Folke Bergman.)
- Carter, T: Paper and block printing - from China to Europe., Seite 86. In: Crowley, D., Heyer, P., (Hrsg.): Communication in history: technology, culture, society. Pearson Allyn & Bacon, 2007.
