= Nationalism and archaeology =

Nationalism and archaeology have been closely related since at least the nineteenth century. Archaeological interpretations and ancient history can be manipulated for nationalist purposes, such as cultivating national mythologies and national mysticism. Frequently this involves the uncritical identification of one's own ethnic group with some ancient or even prehistoric (known only archaeologically) group, whether mainstream scholarship accepts as plausible or rejects as pseudoarchaeology the historical derivation of the contemporary group from the ancient one. The decisive point, often assumed implicitly, that it is possible to derive nationalist or ethnic pride from a population that lived millennia ago and, being known only archaeologically or epigraphically, is not remembered in living tradition.

Examples include Kurds claiming identity with the Medes, Albanians claiming as their origin the Illyrians, Iraqi propaganda invoking Sumer or Babylonia, Hindu nationalists and Tamils claiming as their origin the Indus Valley Civilisation —all of the mentioned groups being known only from either ancient historiographers or archaeology. In extreme cases, nationalists will ignore the process of ethnogenesis altogether and claim ethnic identity of their own group with some scarcely attested ancient ethnicity known to scholarship by the chances of textual transmission or archaeological excavation.

== China ==
In China, the central claim in nationalist archaeology is that modern China is the world's oldest continuous civilization. Chinese archaeology began in an era when the Western historical narrative emphasized the derivative nature of Eastern civilization. These narratives were supported by early Western-initiated projects, like Johan Gunnar Andersson's excavations of Yangshao cultural sites. Harvard-educated "father of Chinese archaeology" Li Ji began his career reinterpreting the material culture—from Stone Age tools to Shang dynasty ruins—to find an origin for Chinese culture within the bounds of China.

The continuous China narrative applies two different types of pressure to excavations. First, digs are undertaken and reported with the goal of finding evidence—presumed to exist—that could validate the belief in an unbroken, singular civilization. For example, the Neolithic sites in Shuanghuaishu are prioritized over other Stone Age remains because of Shuanghuaishu's physical proximity to later Chinese cultural centers. The Ruins of Yinxu, a former Shang Dynasty capital, have long been a focus of excavations, under the idea that material culture discovered supporting the historicity of the Shang Dynasty there, validates classical Chinese writing in general. Archaeologist Kwang-chih Chang describes Nationalism as "a great magnet attracting data" that focuses on discoveries in key locations in Zhongyuan at the expense of peripheral areas of the nation. One example of how this presupposition can distort findings is the Wushan Man. The jawbone of an ape and ancient stone tools—discovered in the same cave—have been presented as evidence for a fringe "out of Asia" alternative to the widely accepted African origin of modern humans, positing the "Wushan Man" and Peking Man as a pre-human extension of China's continuous existence in China.

The other type of nationalistic pressure in Chinese archaeology is the suppression of studies that could disrupt the official narratives of the state. Notably, China restricts access to Tarim mummies like the Beauty of Loulan and the Princess of Xiaohe. To control the debate between the official narrative of Chinese dominance in the Tarim Basin and Uyghur nationalist identification with the mummies, China allows genetic testing only by Chinese scientists in China. American sinologist Victor H. Mair says that he and Italian geneticist Paolo Francalacci were prevented from testing the majority of genetic samples taken from the mummies.

== See also ==
- Afrocentrism
- Archaeology and racism
- Albanian nationalism
- Culture-historical archaeology
- Facts on the Ground
- Giant human skeletons
- Historical revisionism
- Historical revisionism (negationism)
- Irredentism
- Nationalisms Across the Globe
- National myth
- Nationalist historiography
- Nazi archaeology
- Piltdown Man
- Politics of archaeology in Israel and Palestine
