= Beauty of Loulan =

Mummified woman found in China

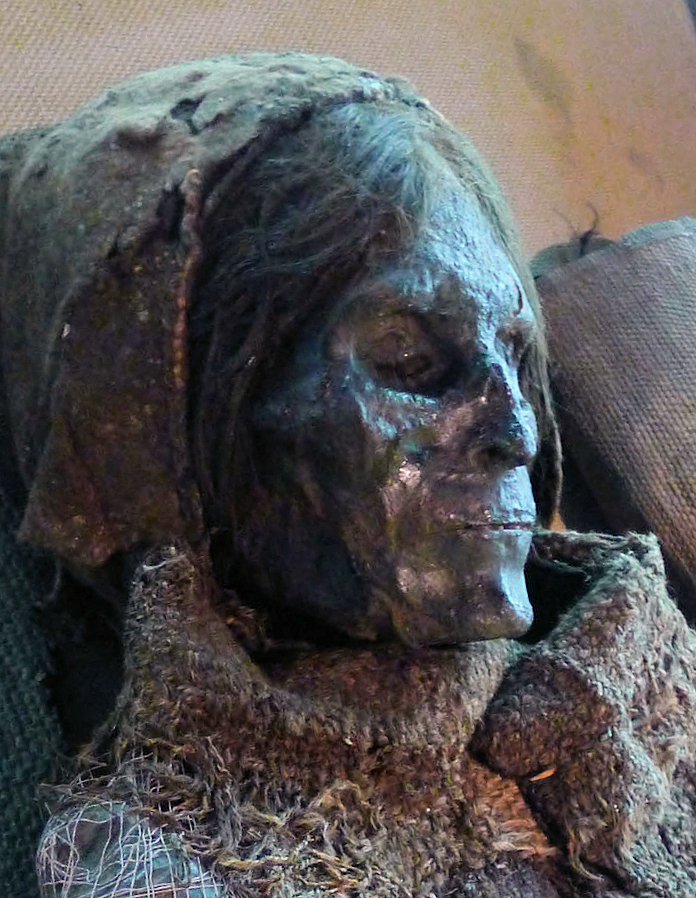
- Born: c. 1845 BC
- Died: c. 1800 BC (aged c. 45)
- Resting place: Xinjiang Museum, Xinjiang, China

The Beauty of Loulan (楼兰美女; c. 1845 BC - c. 1800 BC), also Beauty of Krorän or Loulan Beauty, is the preserved dead body of a woman who lived in the Xinjiang region in what is now China. Due to her excellent state of conservation, she is one of the most famous Tarim mummies.

Exceptionally well-preserved by the elements, the body was discovered in 1980 by Chinese archaeologists alongside several other mummies. The body is not of Chinese appearance, leading to the popular belief that the woman was of Uyghur origin. The Chinese government barred study of the mummies, but samples were smuggled out of the country and tested to find evidence of European ancestry in 1993. These findings were corroborated by further studies by Chinese researchers in 2007 and 2009. The mummy has since been displayed in museums.

== Discovery ==
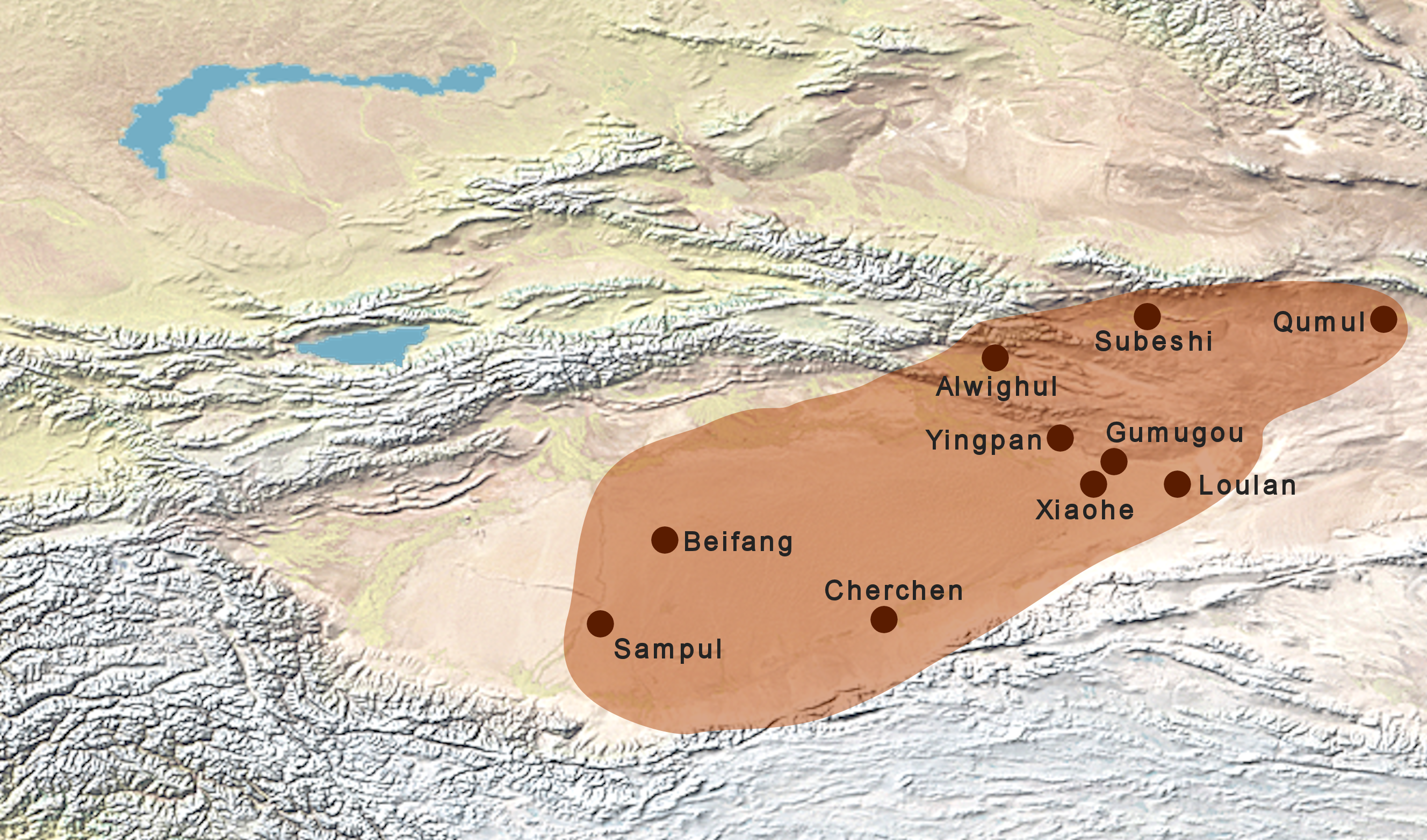
The mummy was found at the eastern end of the Tarim Basin, near Loulan

The individual who became known as the Beauty of Loulan was discovered in 1980 at the Tiebanhe cemetery near Loulan, an ancient settlement at the eastern end of the Tarim Basin in present-day Xinjiang, northwestern China.

The archaeological team, led by Chinese archaeologist Mu Shunying, was exploring the wind-eroded Tiebanhe landscape when it discovered two isolated graves on separate yardangs. The well-preserved body of a woman was recovered from one of them. According to journalist Barbara Demick, the archaeologists were working with a film crew making a documentary about the Silk Road at the time. She had been buried face-up about 0.9 m (3.0 ft) below the surface.

Tiebanhe was one of several early cemeteries in the region, along with Gumugou and Xiaohe Cemetery. Although their burials were arranged differently, their proximity in time and place and shared features in burial practices and grave goods place them within the same early cultural horizon. Archaeologists have identified these sites as belonging to the Xiaohe culture. The Beauty of Loulan is one of the naturally preserved bodies found at cemeteries across the Tarim Basin that are collectively known as the Tarim mummies.

== Condition ==
The Beauty of Loulan was naturally mummified rather than embalmed. About 3,800 years after her burial, her body remained exceptionally well preserved, with her eyelashes, fine body hair, hair and even lines in her skin still visible.

The extreme aridity and sandy, highly saline soils around the southern and eastern edges of the Tarim Basin can naturally preserve human remains by desiccation. The best-preserved bodies were buried in well-drained soils that prevented moisture from reaching the remains.

== Clothing and associated objects ==
The Beauty of Loulan was buried wearing a hide skirt and moccasins. Around her body was a blanket-wrap made from naturally brown sheep's wool. Extra loops of wool were worked into the weave using a technique known as supplementary weft-looping. Other material found with her clothing included cowhide leather and linen.

She also wore a felt hood decorated with a feather and tied around her face with a three-strand braided band. The wool used by this early Loulan population was generally left its natural colour, but one strand in the band securing her hood had been dyed blue. Her leather footwear was trimmed with fur. Examination showed that her clothing and footwear had been extensively worn and repaired during her lifetime.

Objects found with her included pottery vessels, wheat grains, a woven bag or basket, a winnowing tray and a wooden comb that retained four teeth when excavated.

== Scientific analysis ==
She died around 1800 BC and is estimated to have been in her 40s at the time of her death. Examination of the remains found evidence of lice in her hair. Researchers also found evidence that she had inhaled large amounts of sand, dust, and charcoal before her death.

For many years, the Chinese government forbade the testing of the mummy's DNA, due to fears that it would aid Uyghur nationalists. In 1993, Victor Mair and Italian geneticist Paolo Francalacci, were able to test some tissue samples, and although the Chinese government confiscated the samples, Mair claims a Chinese scientist later 'slipped in to their hands' as they were leaving. They concluded that the Loulan Beauty's ancestry came from Europe. Later, in 2007 and 2009, scientists from China's Jilin University and Fudan University both tested samples and corroborated the findings, suggesting that her ancestors may have traveled to Xinjiang through Siberia.

== Exhibition ==
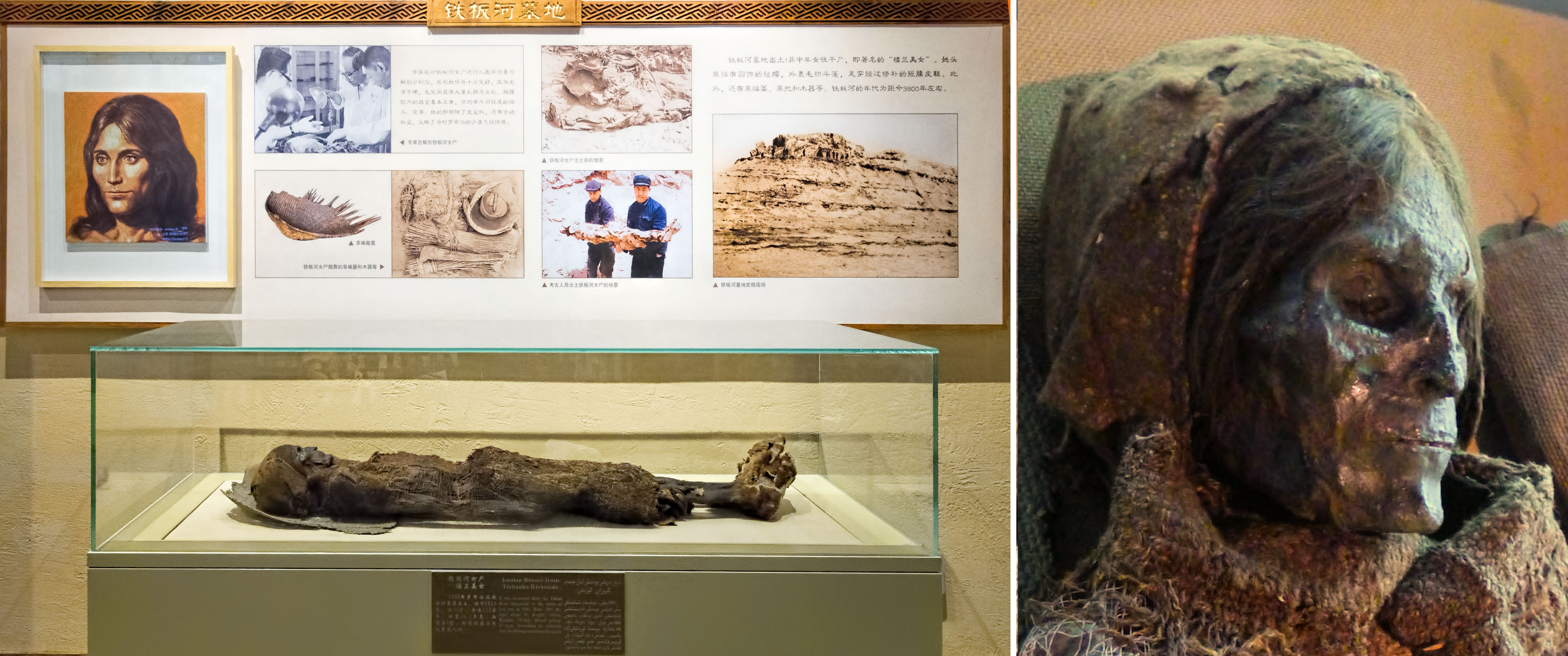
The "Beauty of Loulan" (also "Beauty of Krorän"). Museum exhibit and detail of the face, Xinjiang Museum.

Following the conclusion that the body is not Uighur, the Chinese government allowed the Loulan Beauty to be displayed in museums.

In 1980, her likeness was reconstructed by a Japanese painter named Yamaguchi Terunari (山本耀也), and displayed beside her in the museum. As of 2008, the mummy is displayed on the second floor of the Xinjiang Museum, "Mummy Hall"(古尸馆). The Chinese government has not allowed further access to the mummies by scientists outside China.

== Significance ==
Collectively, the Tarim mummies are evidence of settlement in East Asia by people with European genetic markers far earlier than previously believed. In his 2007 paper on the mummies, Jin Li, a scientist at Fudan University also claimed to find evidence of South and East Asian genetic markers among the set, although Victor H. Mair disputes this finding. Elizabeth Barber examined the cloth fabrics preserved with the mummies and argued that they show ties to the Caucasus and even Scotland.

== See also ==
- History of Xinjiang
- Loulan Beauty – Another "Loulan Beauty", excavated in 2004
- Princess of Xiaohe
