= Princess of Xiaohe =

3,800 year old mummy found in China

- 小河公主
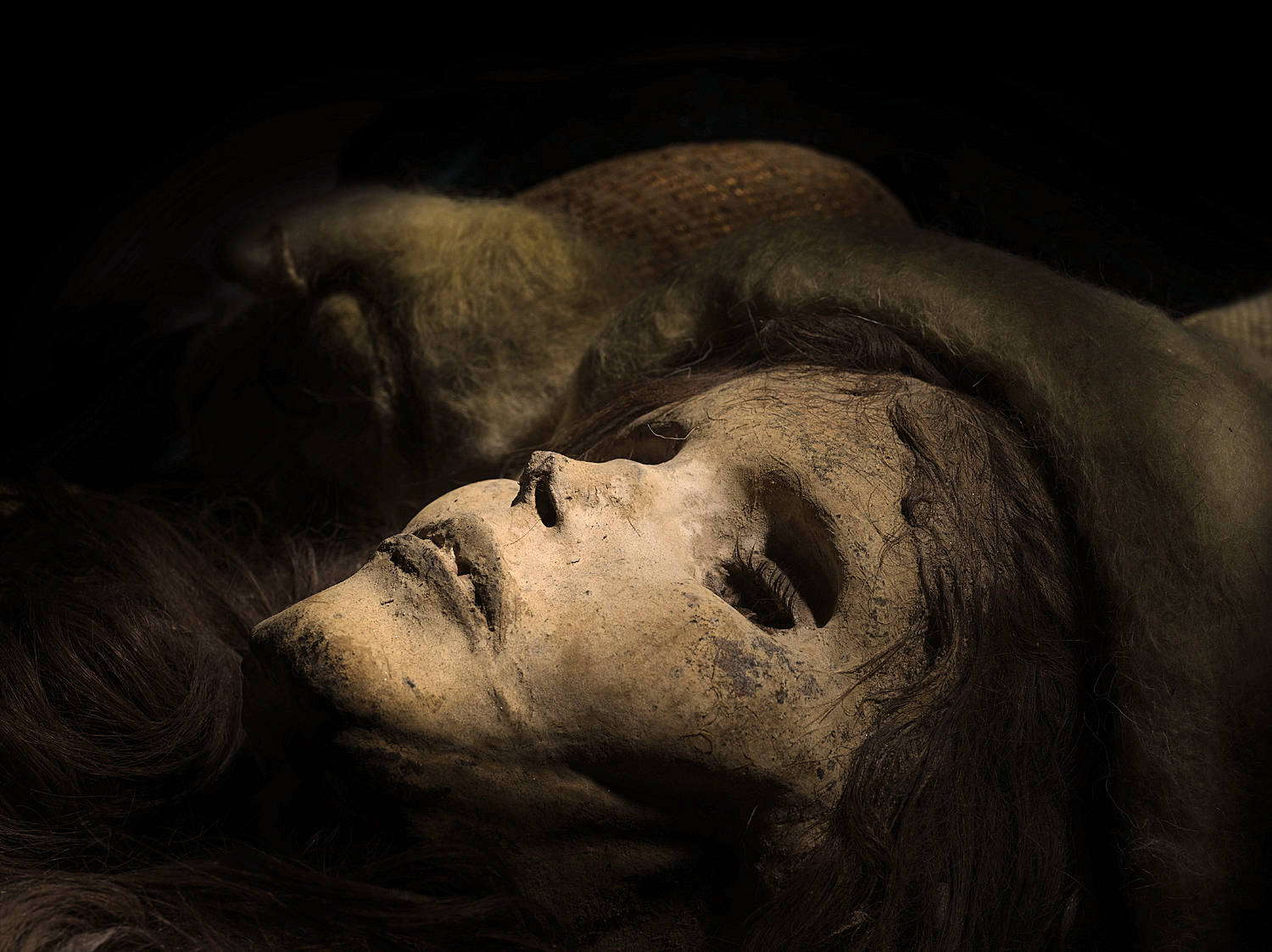
- The Princess of Xiaohe in 2009
- Died: c. 1800 BC
- Body discovered: 2003 in the Xiaohe Cemetery, Xinjiang, China
- Resting place: Xinjiang Museum
- Other name: Little River Princess

The Princess of Xiaohe (Chinese: 小河公主; died c. 1800 BCE), also known as the Little River Princess, is a naturally mummified woman of the Bronze Age and one of the Tarim mummies. She was excavated in 2003 from Tomb M11 at Xiaohe Cemetery in the Lop Nur region of present-day Xinjiang, northwestern China, where she had remained undisturbed for about 3,800 years.

She is unusually well preserved. Her skin, long hair and eyelashes survive, along with her clothing and numerous organic materials placed in her grave.

A 2021 genome-wide study found that the Early Bronze Age people buried at Xiaohe belonged to a genetically isolated population with substantial Ancient North Eurasian ancestry. The researchers found no evidence that they descended from recent western Eurasian pastoralist migrants.

== Discovery ==
The individual now known as the Princess of Xiaohe was found in 2003 during a large excavation of Xiaohe Cemetery in present-day Xinjiang, northwestern China. She had been buried around 1800 BCE in Tomb M11, about 102 km (63 mi) west of the ancient settlement of Loulan, in the Lop Nur region of the Tarim Basin. Her grave had remained undisturbed since her burial.

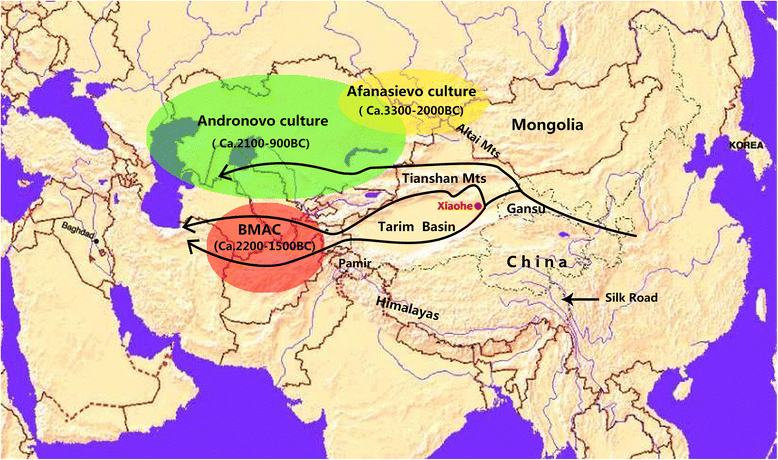
Location of Xiaohe Cemetery in the Tarim Basin of present-day Xinjiang, northwestern China

The cemetery had been known to archaeologists for decades before Tomb M11 was excavated. In 1934, Swedish archaeologist Folke Bergman documented twelve graves at the site. A much larger excavation by the Xinjiang Institute of Archaeology began in 2002 and continued until 2005, uncovering another 167 graves. Parts of the cemetery had been destroyed by natural erosion or human activity, and excavators estimated that it had originally contained about 350 graves.

Tomb M11 was among the burials uncovered during this work. Of the 179 excavated graves, M11 was one of only five, along with M13, M24, M33 and M34, available for detailed study through the excavation report published in 2007.

== Condition ==
She is unusually well preserved, with long eyelashes, clothes, and hair still intact. Archeologists attribute this to the dry, salty conditions in the desert and tightly sealed coffins, which were wrapped in cowhide before being buried. As the cowhide dried out, it shrunk, sealing the coffins. Her body was not embalmed before death, but mummified naturally due to the climate and burial method.

== Burial ==
=== Coffin ===
The Princess of Xiaohe was buried in a boat-shaped wooden coffin. Two long, curved planks formed its sides, while eleven shorter boards covered the top. This form of coffin was commonly used at Xiaohe Cemetery and has been described as resembling an upturned canoe. Three large ox hides, each from a different animal, covered the coffin. A white mantle and twelve thin tamarisk twigs had been laid on the middle hide, and a wooden pole stood at the head of the coffin.

=== Clothing and personal adornment ===
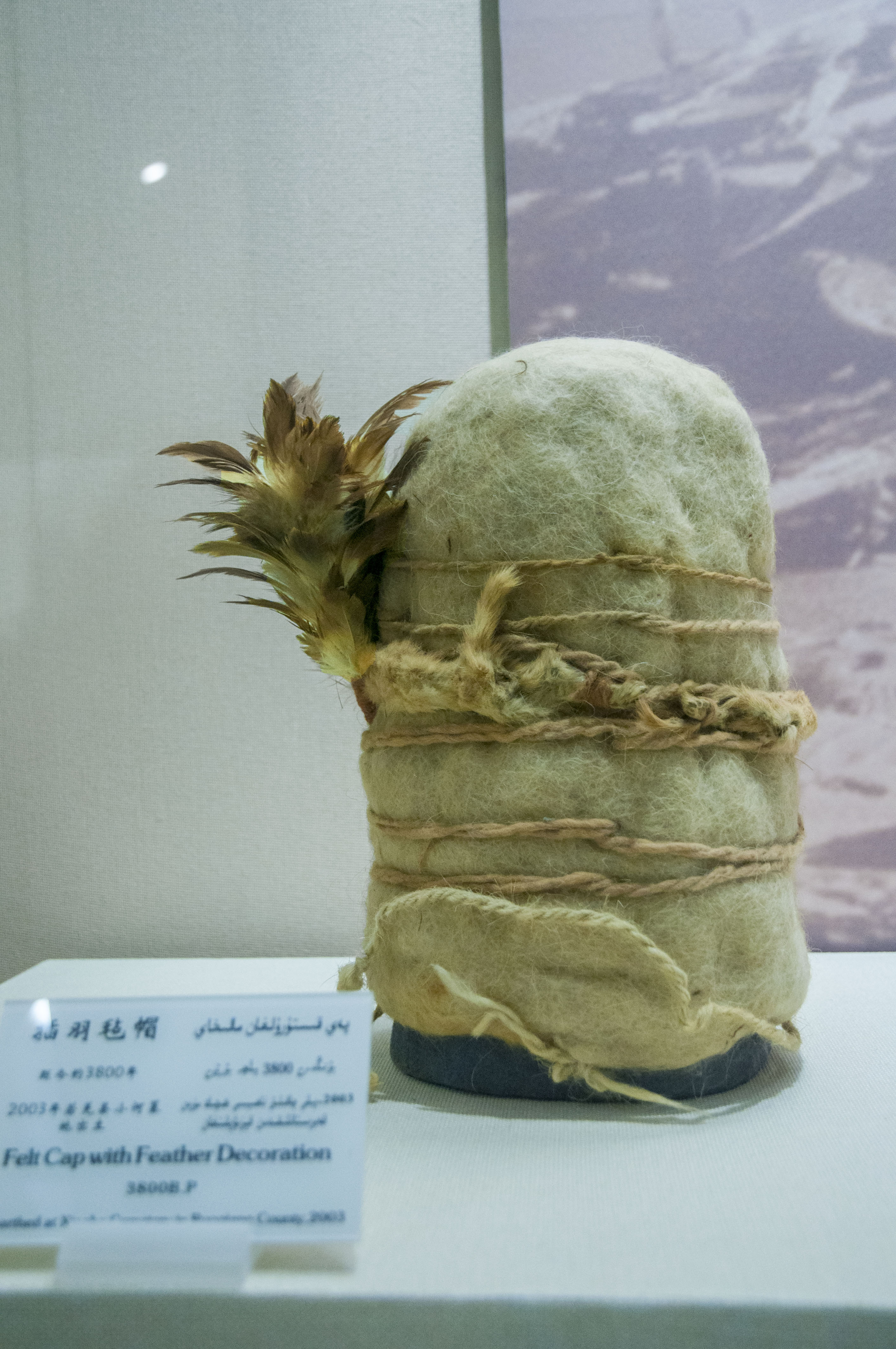
A felt cap from Xiaohe Cemetery. The Princess of Xiaohe was buried wearing a round white felt cap.

In a 2019 study of Bronze Age burial practices, Yunyun Yang described Tomb M11 in detail. The Princess of Xiaohe wore a round white felt cap tied beneath her chin with two strings. On its left side were a leather peg and a dried weasel. Her thick hair was parted in the middle and fell to her chest, and her head rested on a white lambskin pillow.

Her clothing included a white fringed loincloth, tied above her abdomen with its fringe reaching nearly to her knees, and short leather boots with hair on the outside of the soles. Around her neck was a necklace of beads and feathers, while a tubular jade bracelet encircled her right wrist.

Other published descriptions record a white wool cloak with tassels, a string skirt and fur-lined leather boots. They also describe a red rope necklace and a bracelet with a single jade bead on her right arm.

=== Grave goods ===
A white mantle covered most of her body, leaving her head, lower legs and feet exposed. It was laid with its fringed side facing upward and held in place with two curved wooden pins and two short tamarisk twigs. Along its right edge were three small pouches containing ephedra twigs. More ephedra had been placed beside and around her body.

Objects were arranged both around and beneath her. Beside her right knee was a basket covered with greyish-white felt and tied with brownish-yellow wool yarn; dried food remained inside. Between her right arm and her body was a leather bag tied with red string, with a tamarisk twig beside it. Beneath her hip lay a red-painted wooden comb with seven teeth.

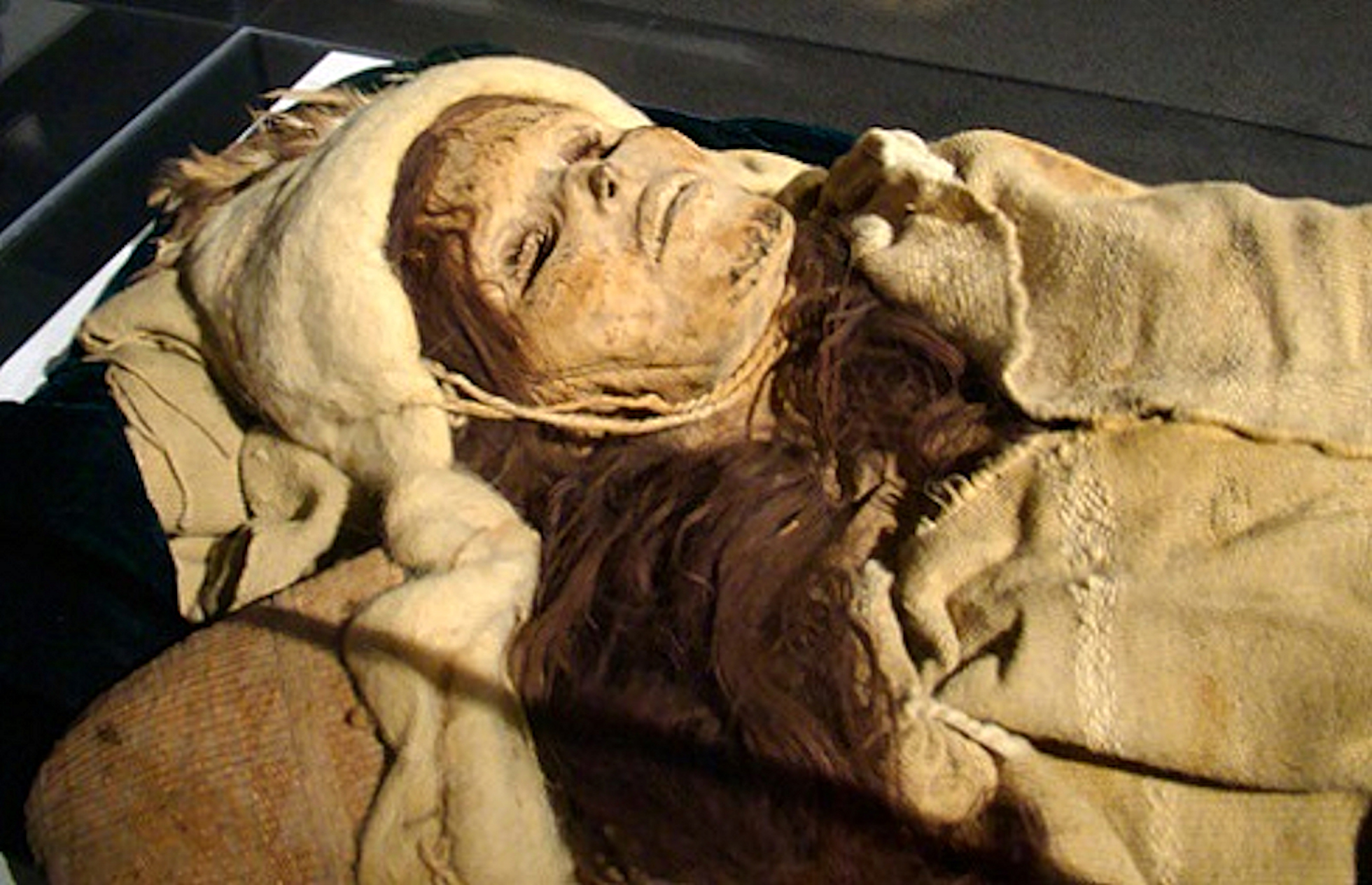
The Princess of Xiaohe with clothing and other materials from her burial preserved around her

Wheat and millet grains, strings made from animal tendons, and animal ears were also spread over her body. Yang recorded the arrangement in greater detail: ephedra twigs, animal ears, animal-derived string and a whitish substance lay around her neck and chest, while millet and unidentified grains lay on her stomach. Between her breasts were a leather arrow and a wooden phallic object, the latter wrapped with yellow strings.

Whitish material was also recorded on her body, hair and boots. Similar pale organic masses found with other mummies at Xiaohe Cemetery were identified through protein analysis as a fermented dairy product made using a kefir starter.

== Scientific analysis ==
The Princess has long hair and eyelashes, with some facial features more similar to Ancient North Eurasians than modern people of the region she was found in, such as high cheekbones. She seems to be smiling slightly. She was 1.52 m (5 ft 0 in) tall.

Genetic studies cited in Chinese media reports have identified ancestry related to both western Eurasian and Siberian populations among the people buried at Xiaohe.

== Exhibitions ==
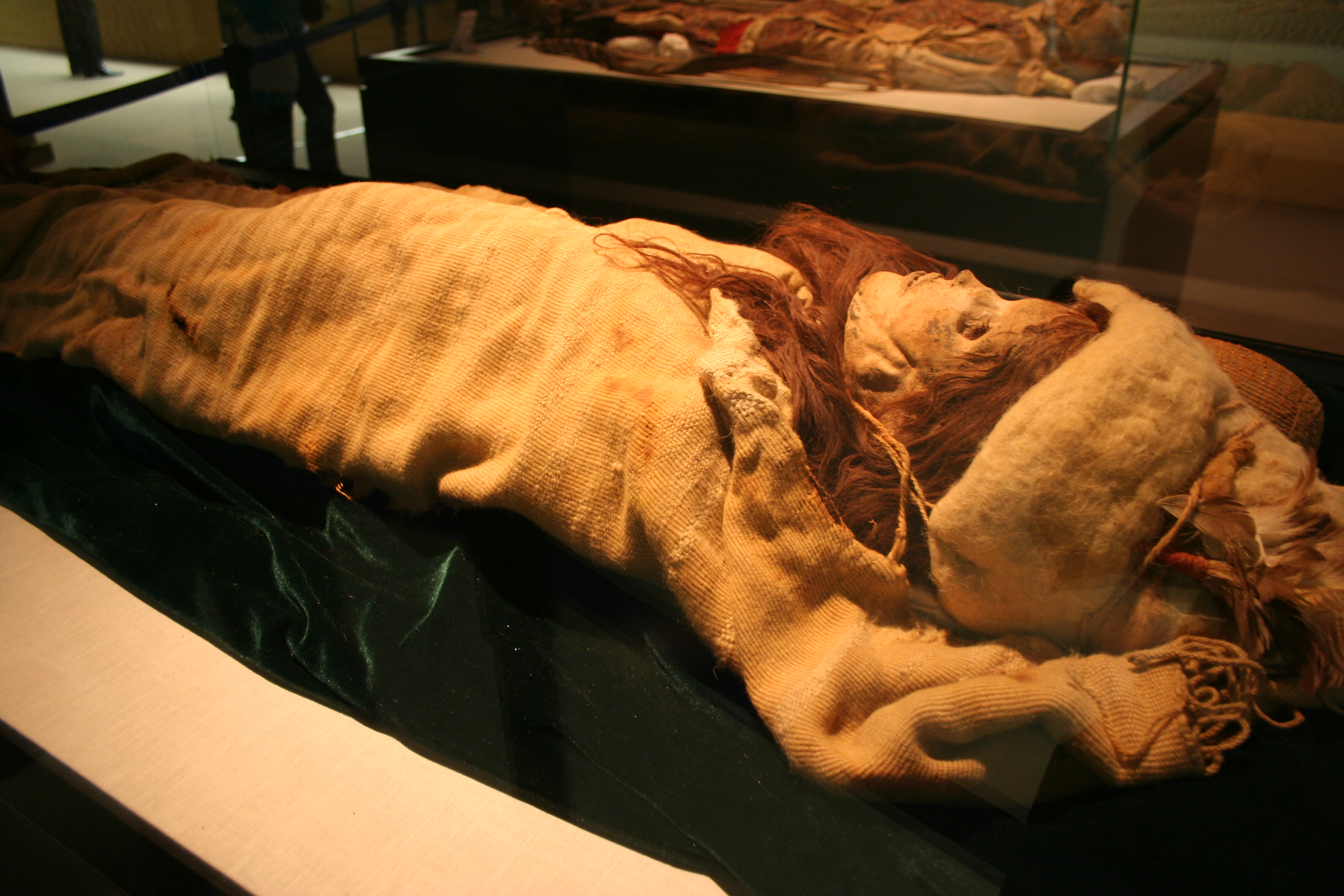
The Princess of Xiaohe on display at the Beijing Capital Museum

In 2010, she was exhibited at Bowers Museum in Santa Ana, California, Houston Museum of Natural Science, and University of Pennsylvania Museum of Archaeology and Anthropology. In 2019, she was exhibited at the Arthur M. Sackler Museum of Art and Archaeology at Peking University. She was featured in the first episode of the documentary series New Silk Road.

== See also ==
- Tarim mummies
- Beauty of Loulan
