= Tarim mummies =

Series of mummies discovered in the Tarim Basin

Coordinates: 40.336453°N 88.672422°E

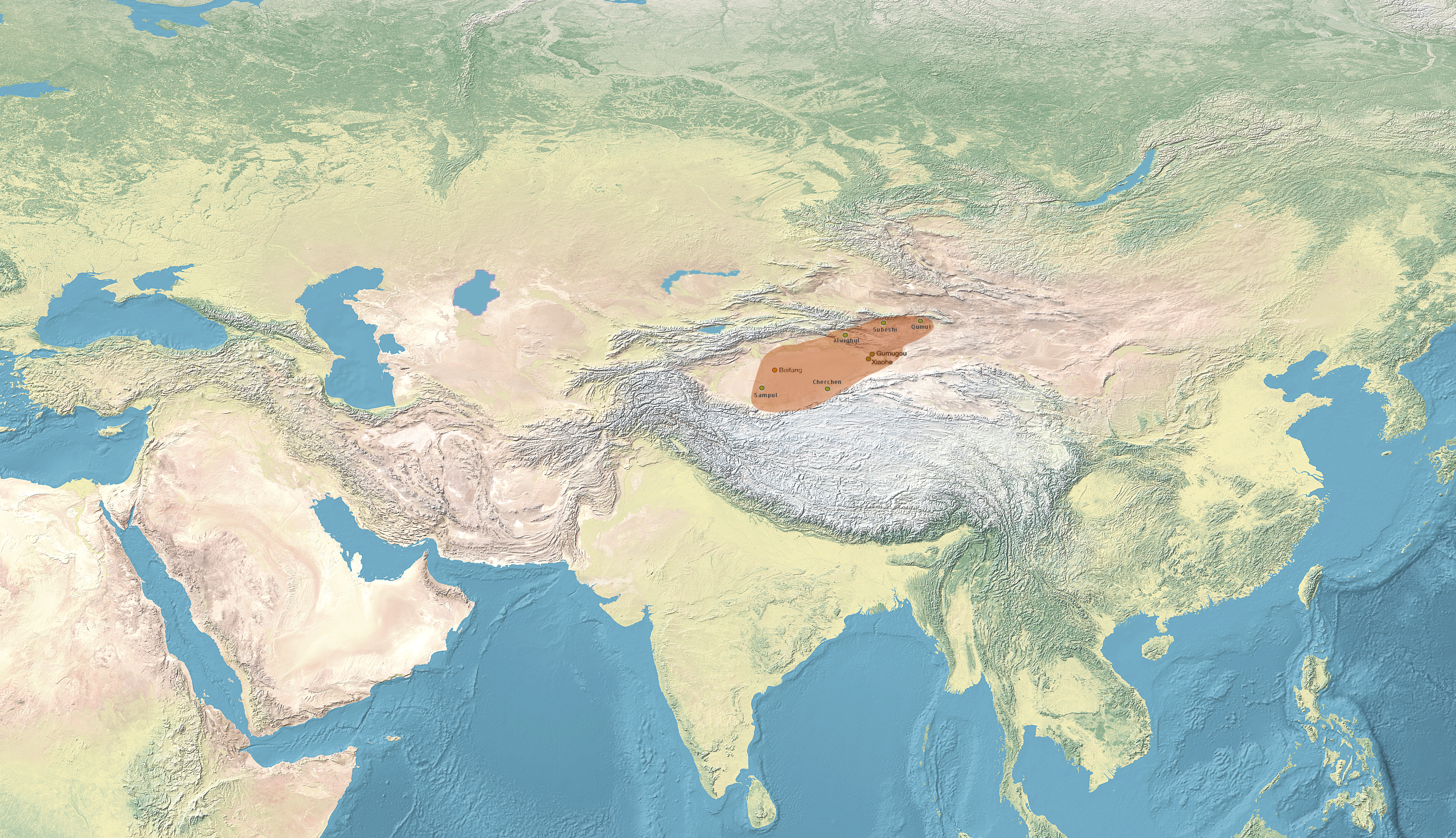
- Location of the Tarim mummies ( ), with other contemporary cultures c. 2000 BCE
- Geographical range: Taklamakan Desert in the Tarim Basin
- Period: Bronze Age
- Dates: c. 2100 BCE – 1 BCE
- Preceded by: Afanasievo culture
- Followed by: Tocharians

The Tarim mummies are a series of mummies discovered in the Tarim Basin in present-day Xinjiang, China, which date from 1800 BCE to the first centuries BCE, with a new group of individuals recently dated to between c. 2100 and 1700 BCE. The Tarim population to which the earliest mummies belonged was agropastoral, and they lived c. 2000 BCE in what was formerly a freshwater environment, which has now become desertified.

Zhang et al. (2021) found that these early mummies (dating from 2,135 to 1,623 BCE) had high levels of Ancient North Eurasian ancestry (ANE, about 72%), with smaller admixture from Ancient Northeast Asians (ANA, about 28%), but no detectable Western Steppe-related ancestry. They formed a genetically isolated local population that "adopted neighbouring pastoralist and agriculturalist practices, which allowed them to settle and thrive along the shifting riverine oases of the Taklamakan Desert." These mummified individuals were long suspected to have been "Proto-Tocharian-speaking pastoralists", related to the Afanasievo or BMAC cultures, but "the earliest Tarim Basin cultures appear to have arisen from a genetically isolated local population." Zhang et al. (2025) investigated a Late Bronze Age site in the far west of the Tarim Basin, dated 1600 to 1400 BC. Its inhabitants overwhelmingly descended from the Sintashta and Andronovo population, with additional ancestry from BMAC (10%) and Tarim_EMBA (12%). Nearly all subjects belonged to Y-DNA haplogroup R-M17.

Later Tarim Mummies dated to the Iron Age (1st millennium BCE), such as those of the Subeshi culture, have characteristics closely resembling those of the Saka (Scythian) Pazyryk culture of the Altai Mountains, in particular in the areas of weaponry, horse gear and garments. They are candidates as the Iron Age predecessors of the Tocharians.

== Discovery ==
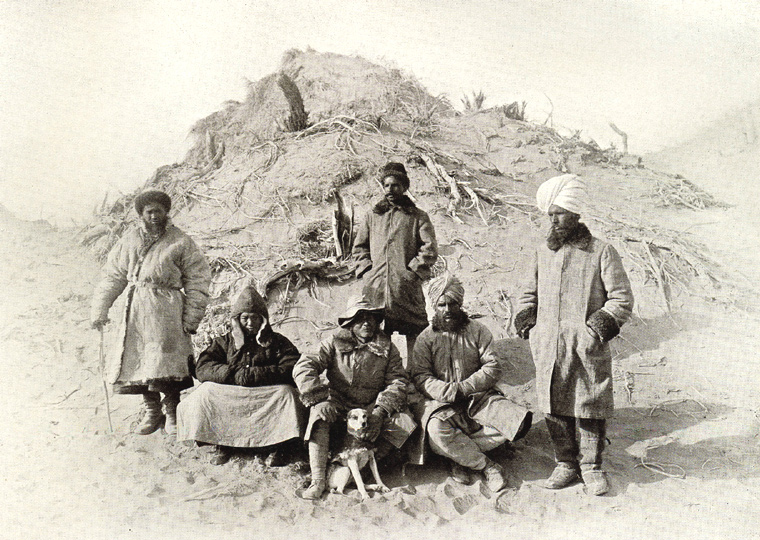
British archaeologist Aurel Stein in the Tarim Basin in 1910

The Tarim mummies were discovered at ancient cemeteries and settlements across the Tarim Basin, a large desert basin in present-day Xinjiang in northwestern China. The first remains became known to archaeologists during expeditions to the region in the late 19th and early 20th centuries. European explorers including Sven Hedin, a Swedish geographer and explorer; Albert von Le Coq, a German archaeologist; and Aurel Stein, a Hungarian-born British archaeologist, encountered naturally preserved human bodies while investigating ancient sites around the Taklamakan Desert, which occupies much of the centre of the basin. Over the following century, hundreds of naturally mummified bodies were identified at sites around the basin.

Some of the oldest remains were found in cemeteries around the eastern and southern margins of the desert. At Gumugou, a cemetery near the former Lop Nur lake in the eastern Tarim Basin, the earliest burials date to about 2135–1939 BCE, making them roughly 4,000 years old. The earliest mummies at Xiaohe Cemetery, another burial ground in the Lop Nur region, date to about 1884–1736 BCE, while those at Beifang, in the southern Tarim Basin, date to about 1785–1664 BCE.

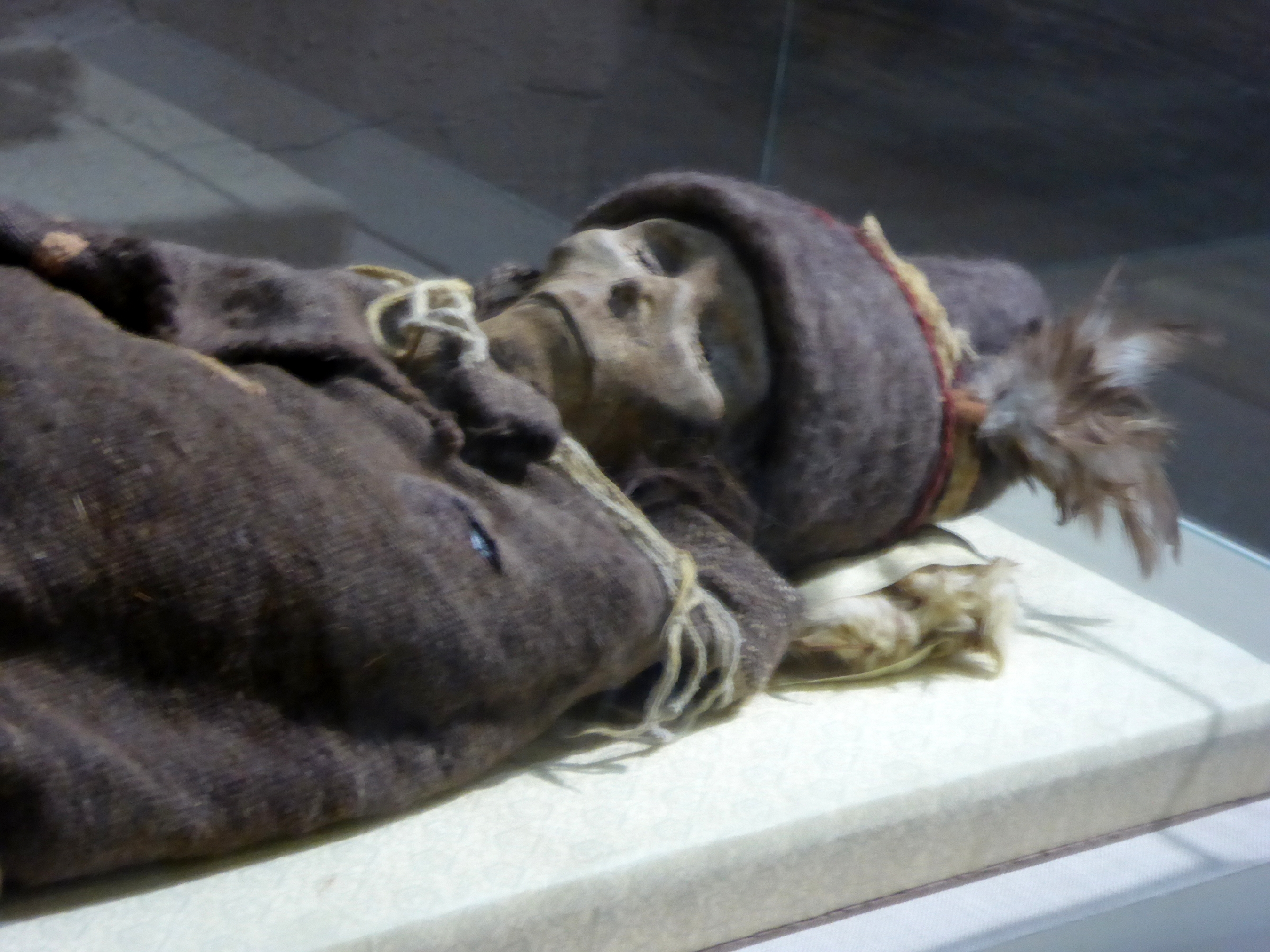
The "Xiaohe Mummy", exhibited in Xinjiang Museum, is one of the oldest Tarim mummies, dating more than 3800 years ago. Another mummy from the same place is the "Princess of Xiaohe".

Of these early cemeteries, Xiaohe has one of the best documented modern discovery histories. In 1911, Ördek, a local hunter who had previously assisted Swedish explorer Sven Hedin in locating the ruins of Loulan, encountered the cemetery in the desert west of the ancient settlement. Wooden posts marking the graves projected above the desert surface.

Twenty-three years later, in 1934, Ördek guided Folke Bergman, a Swedish archaeologist, back to the cemetery. Bergman excavated 12 burials and named the site Xiaohe, meaning "Small River", after a nearby watercourse.

After Bergman's expedition, the precise location of Xiaohe was lost to archaeologists for more than 60 years. It was relocated in 2000 by a team from the Xinjiang Archaeological Institute using GPS equipment. Systematic excavations followed between 2002 and 2005, about 90 years after Ördek first encountered the cemetery.

By the early 21st century, mummies had been identified at numerous sites across the Tarim Basin and dated to periods spanning more than two millennia. The earliest known examples date to the late third and early second millennia BCE, while other naturally preserved bodies from the basin date to the Iron Age and the first centuries CE.

== Notable individuals ==
=== Cherchen Man and the Zaghunluq burials ===
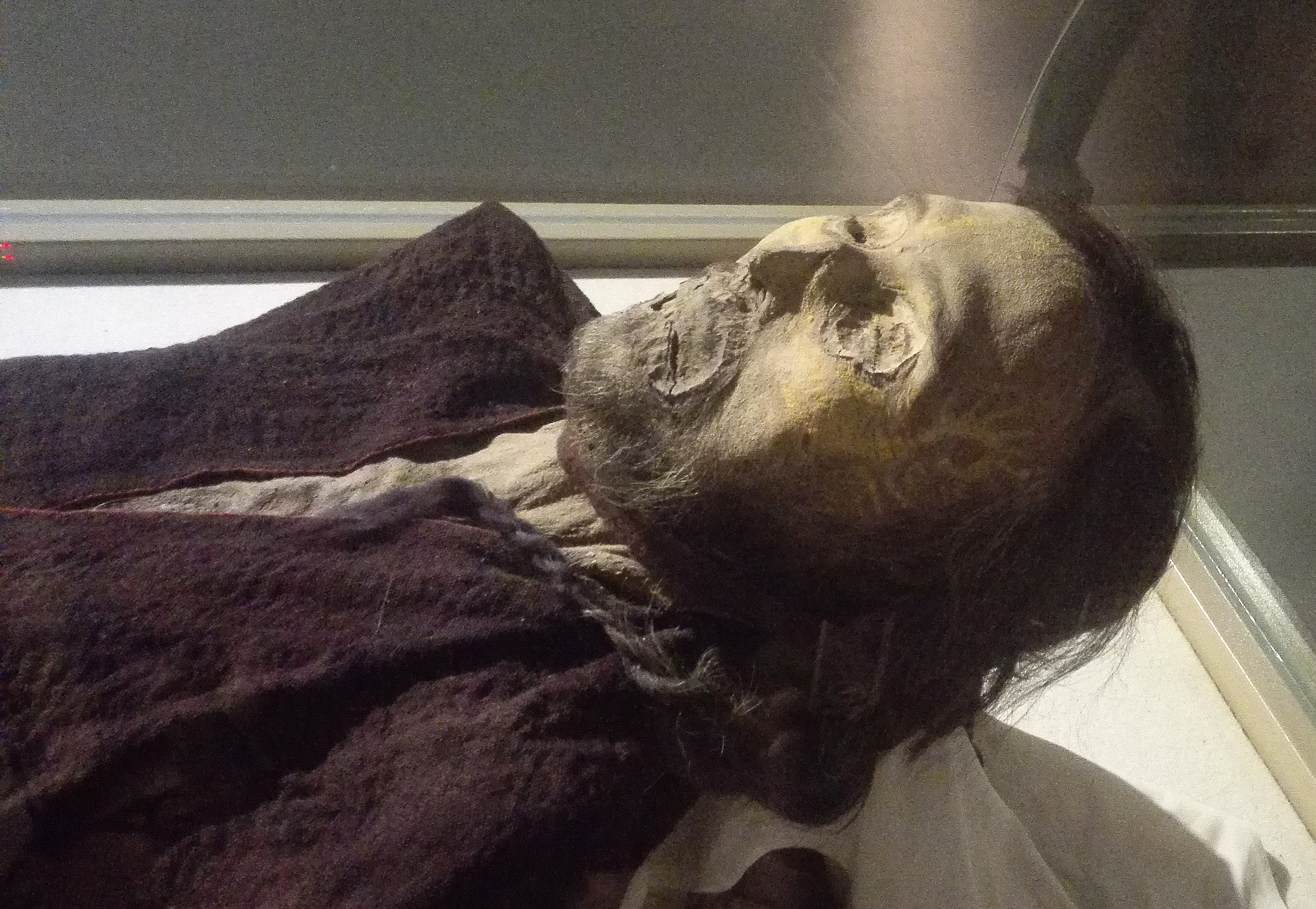
Cherchen Man, buried at Zaghunluq around 1000 BCE

Cherchen Man was one of five individuals excavated from two intact graves at the Zaghunluq cemetery near Qiemo, on the southeastern edge of the Tarim Basin. In September 1985, his body was found in Tomb 85QZM 2 with three adult women; nearby Tomb 85QZM 1 contained an infant. The adult grave has been radiocarbon dated to around 1000 BCE. Cherchen Man lay on his right side with his legs bent and wore dark purple woollen clothing, felt socks and white deerskin boots. Painted ochre designs were preserved on his face. Two of the women were only partially preserved, while the third wore a dark reddish-brown woollen dress and white deerskin boots, with four braids, two of them artificial, and painted designs on her face.

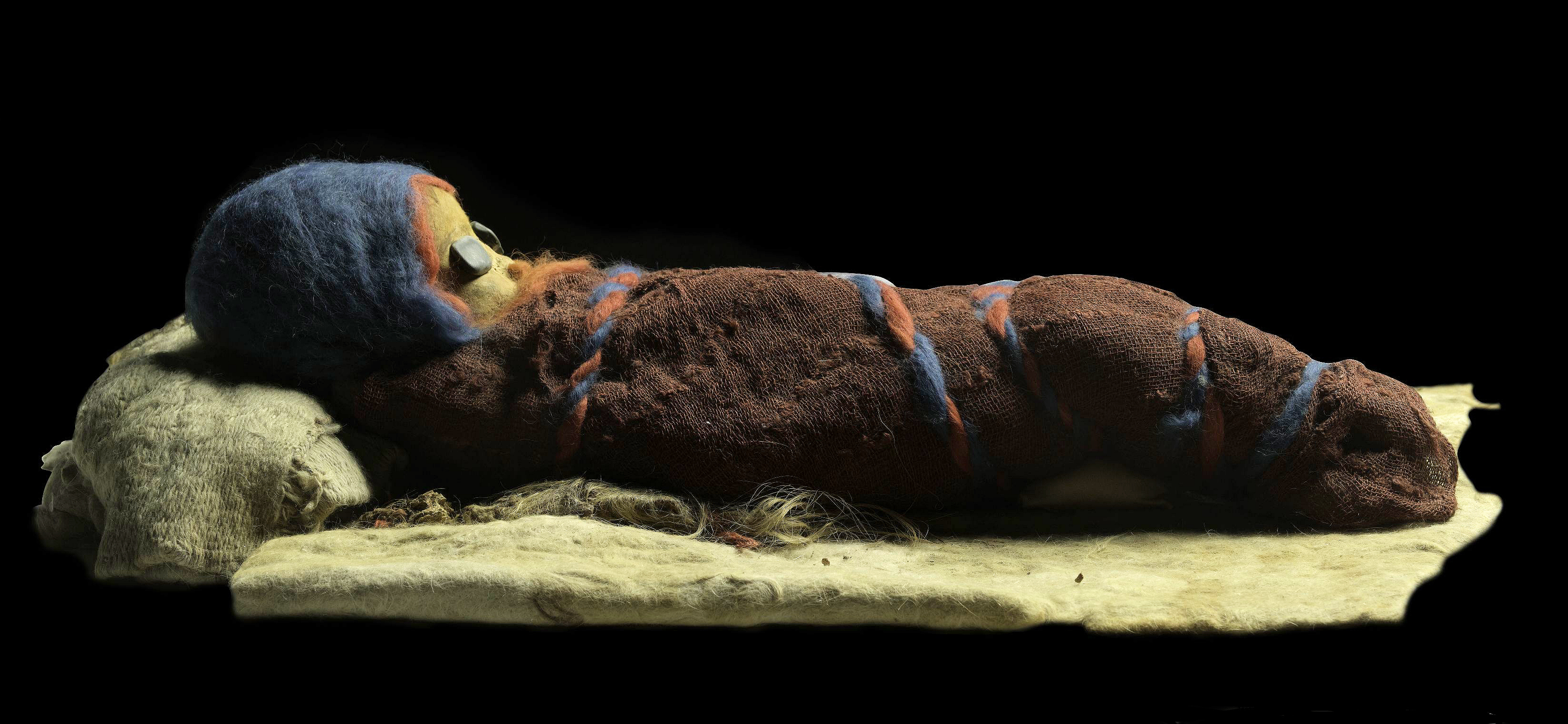
The infant buried separately in Tomb 85QZM 1 at Zaghunluq

The infant was wrapped in purple wool and wore a blue woollen hat, with two small stones placed over the eyes. A bovine-horn cup and sheep teat, possibly used for feeding, lay near the head.

Based on similarities in their burial garments, archaeologist Victor H. Mair suggested that Cherchen Man, one of the women and the infant may have formed a family group, although their relationships are unknown.

=== Witches of Subeshi ===
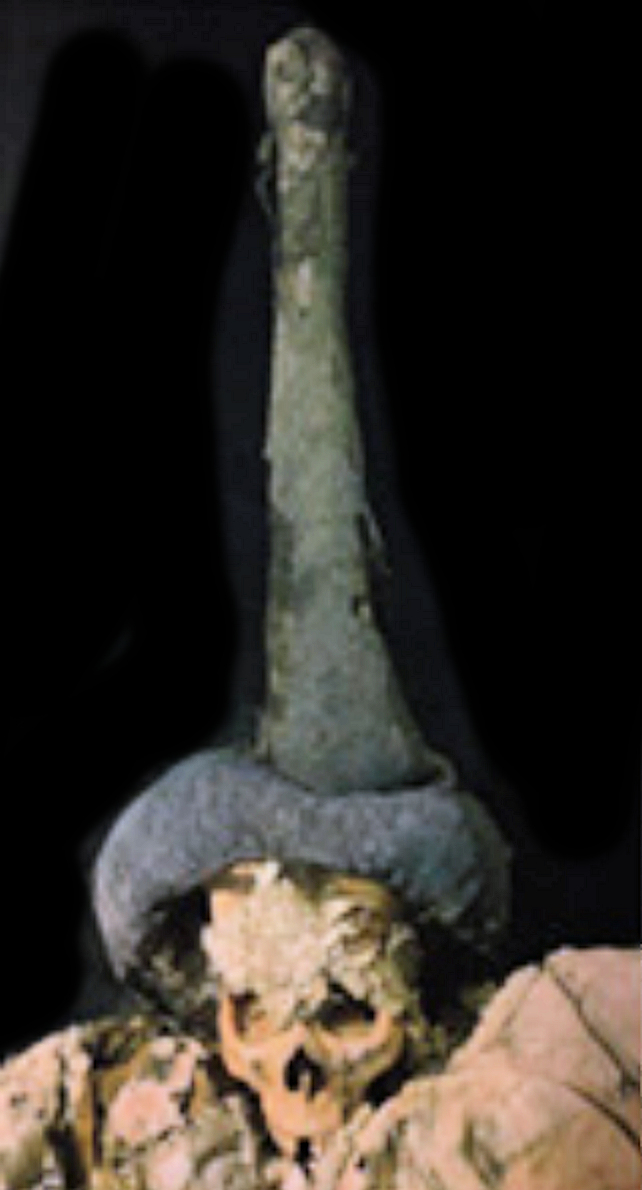
High-peaked felt hat from the Subeshi cemetery, dating to the first millennium BCE. Similar pointed headgear found with naturally preserved women at Subeshi led to their modern nickname, the "Witches of Subeshi".

The individuals who became known as the "Witches of Subeshi" are naturally preserved women from Subeshi, an Iron Age cemetery and settlement near Turpan in eastern Xinjiang. Dating to approximately the fifth to third centuries BCE, the women are known for the distinctive tall, pointed hats found with their remains.

The surviving headgear was not uniform. At least some examples were made from dark felt, densely rolled and stitched to create a tall, tapered peak. One surviving hat has a broad brim and netting that appears to have held the woman's hair in place. The women were buried wearing other well-preserved clothing, including woollen garments and leather footwear.

The pointed headgear resembles the stereotypical witch's hat of later European culture, leading to the modern nickname "Witches of Subeshi". The name does not describe an archaeological identification: there is no evidence that the women were regarded as witches by their own community. Similar forms of pointed headgear were worn elsewhere in ancient Central Asia, including among groups described in Persian sources as Saka.

=== Yingpan Man ===
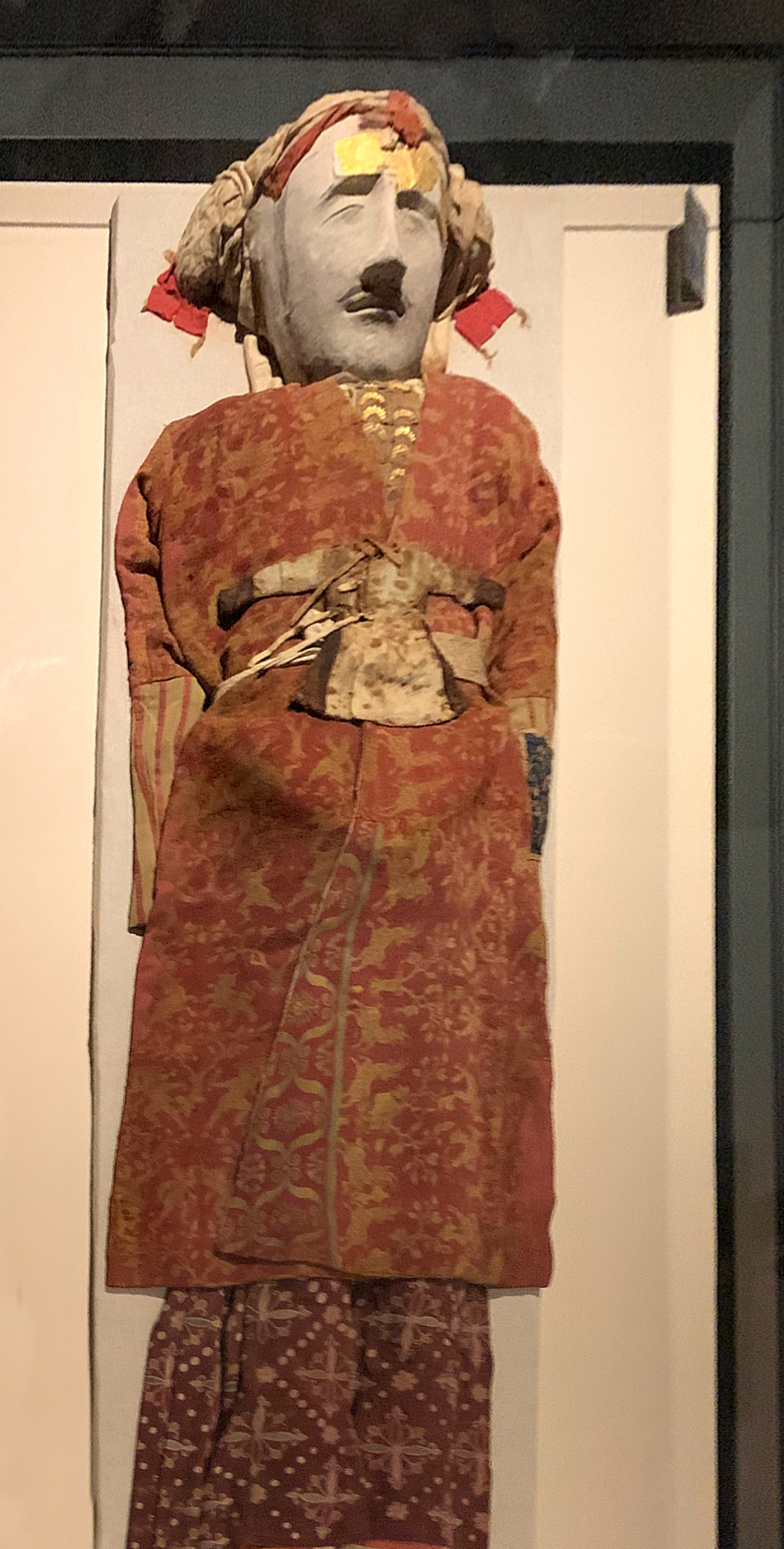
Yingpan Man in his richly decorated woollen caftan, with a white death mask and gold diadem

The Yingpan man was a naturally preserved man excavated in 1995 from the Yingpan cemetery in the Lop Nur region. About 30 years old and 1.9 m (6 ft 3 in) tall, he died around 300 CE. His exceptionally rich burial included a red and yellow woollen caftan decorated with winged figures, animals and pomegranate trees, embroidered trousers, silk and gold decoration, and a gold diadem. Isotope analysis suggests that he grew up in an arid environment and had not travelled widely during the last years of his life, challenging earlier suggestions that he was a travelling Sogdian merchant.

=== Princess of Xiaohe ===
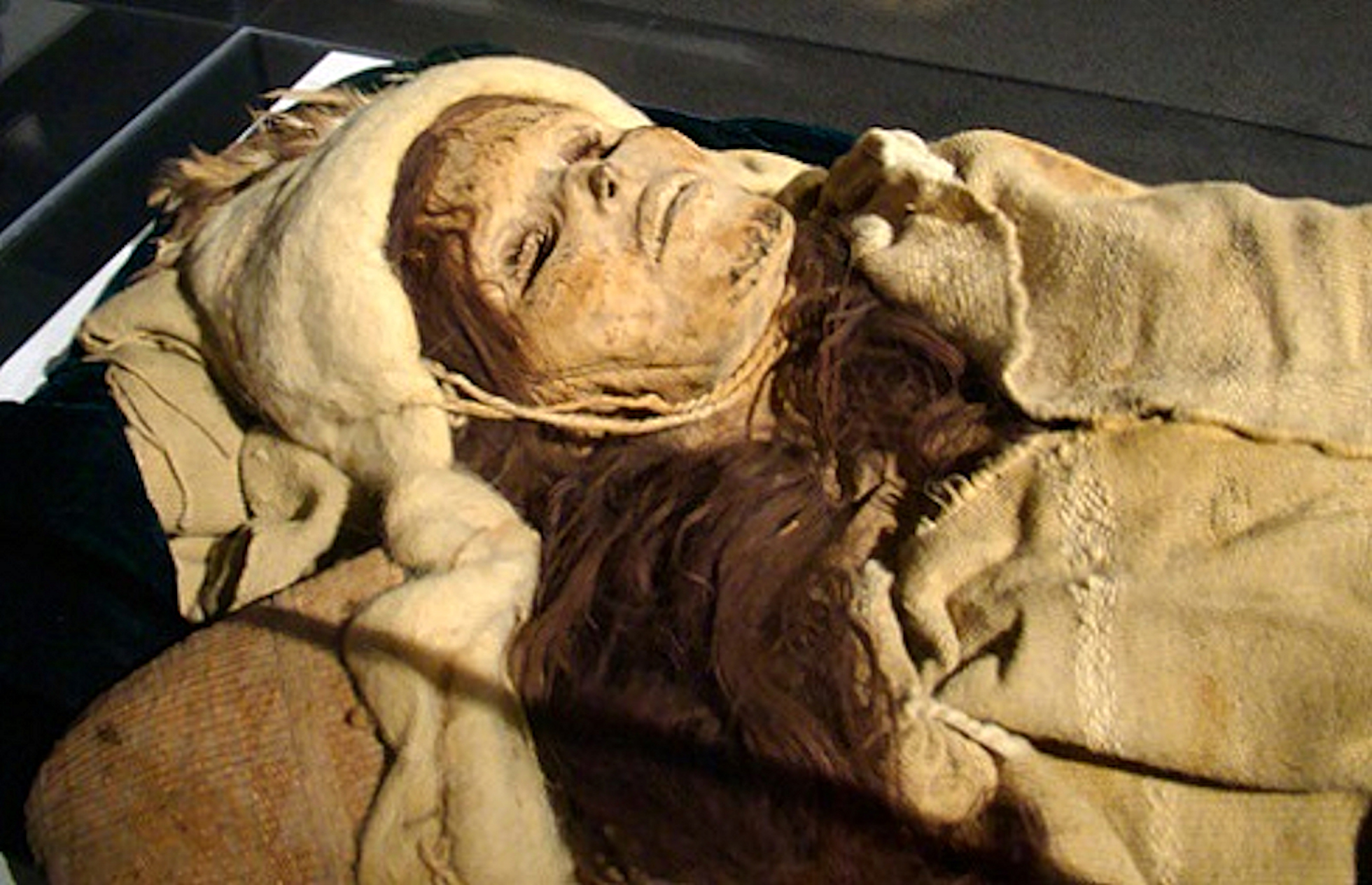
The Princess of Xiaohe, with clothing and other materials from her burial preserved around her

The Princess of Xiaohe is a naturally mummified woman who died around 1800 BCE. She was excavated in 2003 from Tomb M11 at Xiaohe Cemetery in the Lop Nur region of present-day Xinjiang, northwestern China. Her grave had remained undisturbed for about 3,800 years.

She is unusually well preserved, with her skin, long hair and eyelashes surviving along with her clothing and numerous organic materials placed in her grave. She was buried in a boat-shaped wooden coffin covered by three ox hides. She wore a round white felt cap decorated with a leather peg and a dried weasel, a fringed loincloth, leather boots, a necklace of beads and feathers, and a jade bracelet. Her grave also contained ephedra, grains, a basket containing dried food, a leather bag, a wooden comb and a wooden phallic object.

A 2021 genome-wide study found that the Early Bronze Age people buried at Xiaohe belonged to a genetically isolated population with substantial Ancient North Eurasian ancestry. The researchers found no evidence that they descended from recent western Eurasian pastoralist migrants. Despite this genetic isolation, the Xiaohe population participated in wider cultural exchanges and practiced dairy pastoralism and cereal agriculture.

=== The Beauty of Loulan ===
The Beauty of Loulan (also referred to as the "Loulan Beauty" or the "Beauty of Krorän") is the most famous of the Tarim mummies, along with the Cherchen Man. She was discovered in 1980 by Chinese archaeologists working on a film about the Silk Road. The mummy was discovered near Lop Nur. She was buried 3 feet beneath the ground. The mummy was extremely well preserved because of the dry climate and the preservative properties of salt. She was wrapped in a woolen cloth; the cloth was made of two separate pieces and was not large enough to cover her entire body, thereby leaving her ankles exposed. The Beauty of Loulan was surrounded by funerary gifts. The Beauty of Loulan has been dated back to approximately 1800 BCE.

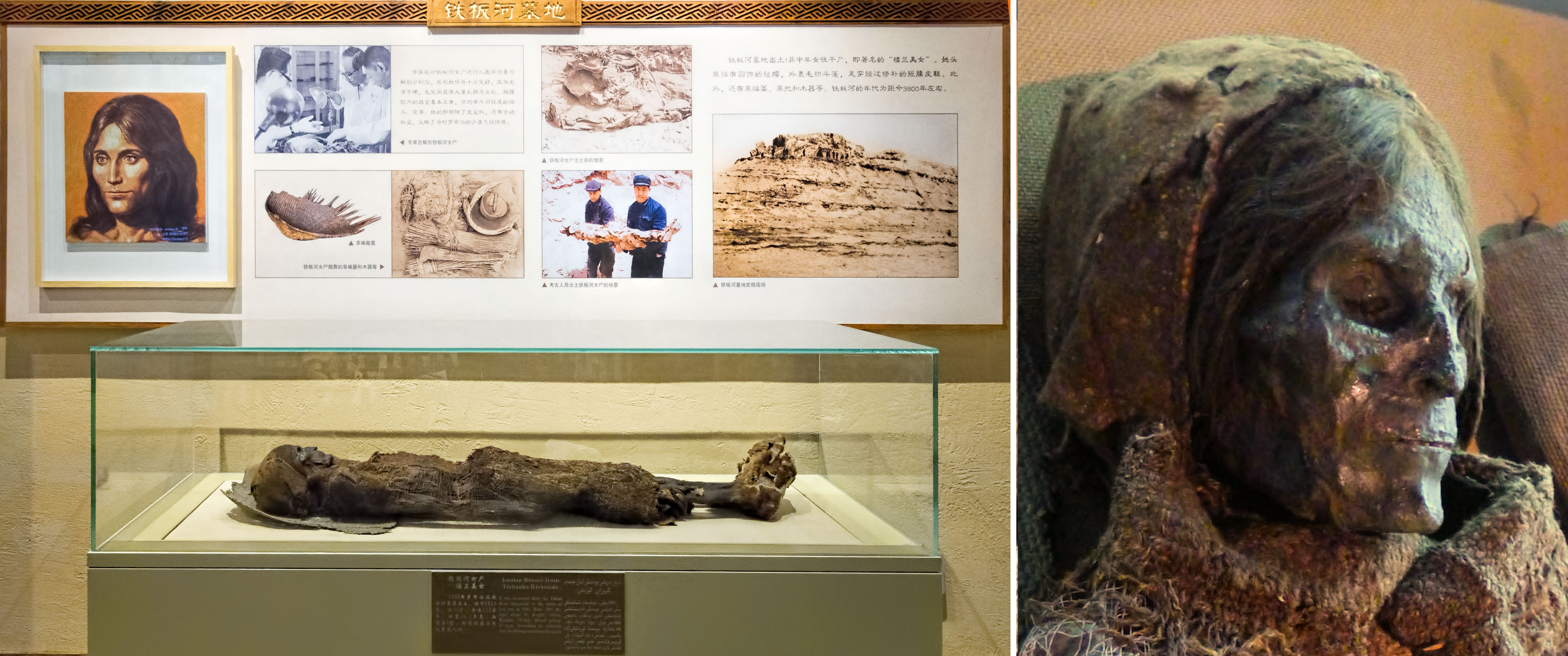
The Beauty of Loulan (also "Beauty of Krorän"). Museum exhibit and detail of the face, Xinjiang Museum.

The Beauty of Loulan lived around 1800 BCE, until about the age of 45, when she died. Her cause of death is likely due to lung failure from ingesting a large amount of sand, charcoal, and dust. According to Elizabeth Barber, she probably died in the winter because of her provisions against the cold. The rough shape of her clothes and the lice in her hair suggest she lived a difficult life.

The Beauty of Loulan's hair colour has been described as auburn. Her hair was infested with lice. The Beauty of Loulan is wearing clothing made of wool and fur. Her hood is made of felt and has a feather in it. She is wearing rough ankle-high moccasins made of leather, with fur on the outside. Her skirt is made of leather, with fur on the inside for warmth. She is also wearing a woolen cap. According to Elizabeth Barber, these provisions against the cold suggest she died during the winter. The Beauty of Loulan possesses a comb, with four teeth remaining. Barber suggests that this comb was a dual purpose tool to comb hair and to "pack the weft in tightly during weaving". She possesses a "neatly woven bag or soft basket". Grains of wheat were discovered inside the bag.

=== Other mummies ===
Notable mummies include the "Hami Mummy" (c. 1400–800 BCE), a "red-headed beauty" found in Qizilchoqa. Also found at Subeshi was a man with traces of a surgical operation on his abdomen; the incision is sewn up with sutures made of horsehair.

== Archaeological record ==
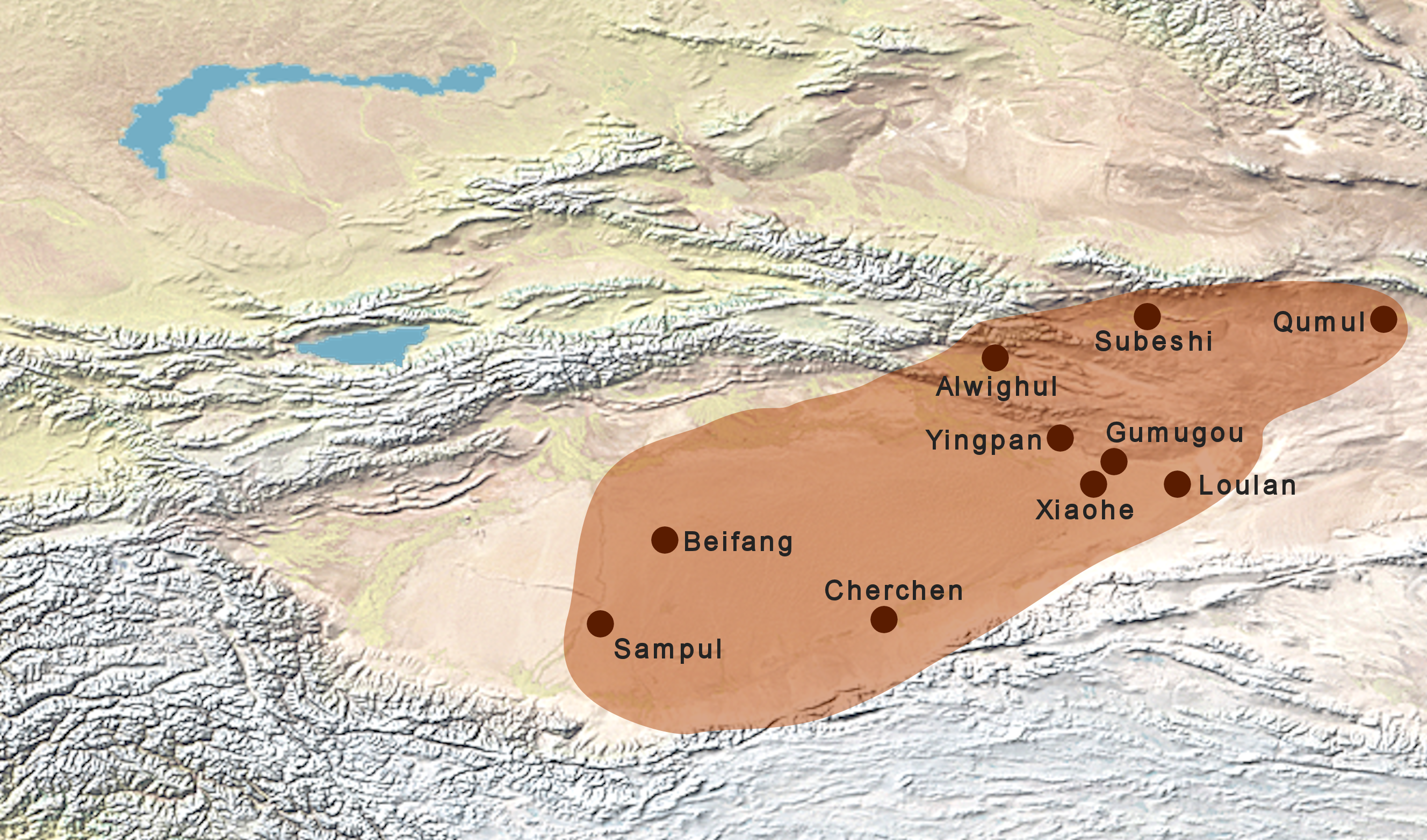
The Tarim Basin, with the Taklamakan Desert, and area of the Tarim mummies ( ) with main burial sites.

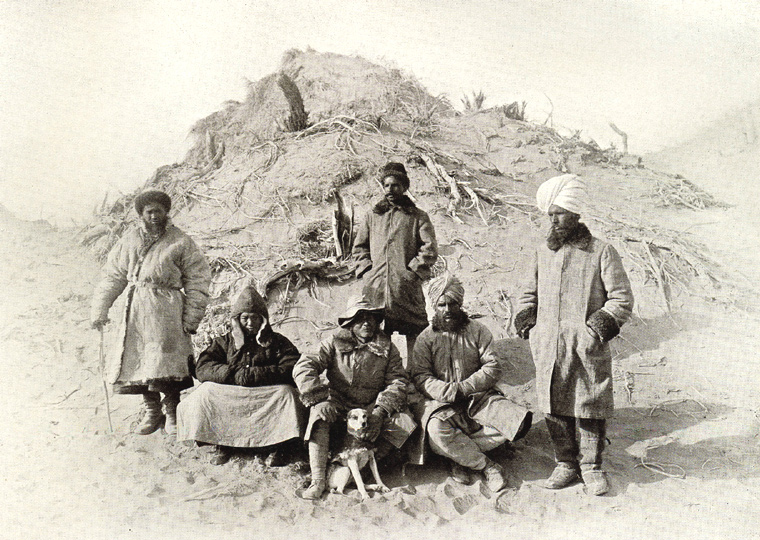
Sir Aurel Stein in the Tarim Basin, 1910

According to Mallory & Mair (2000), the earliest Tarim mummies, found at Qäwrighul (Gumugou) and dated to 2135–1939 BCE, were classified in a craniometric analysis as belonging to a "Proto-Europoid" type, whose closest affiliation is to the Bronze Age populations of southern Siberia, Kazakhstan, Central Asia, and the Lower Volga. A revised craniometric analyses by Hemphill & Mallory (2003) on the early Tarim mummies (Qäwrighul) failed to demonstrate close phenetic affinities to "Europoid populations", but rather found that they formed their own cluster, distinct from the European-related Steppe pastoralists of the Andronovo and Afanasievo cultures, or the inhabitants of the Western Asian BMAC culture. Later Tarim mummies displayed varying affinities with Andronovo-like, BMAC-like or Han-like populations, suggesting different waves of migration into the Tarim basin.

Many of the mummies have been found in very good condition, owing to the dryness of the desert and the desiccation it produced in the corpses. The mummies share many features associated with Europeans and many them have their hair physically intact, ranging in color from blond to red to deep brown, and generally long, curly and braided. Their costumes, and especially textiles, may indicate a common origin with Indo-European neolithic clothing techniques or a common low-level textile technology. Chärchän man wore a red twill tunic and tartan leggings. Textile expert Elizabeth Wayland Barber, who examined the tartan-style cloth, discusses similarities between it and fragments recovered from salt mines associated with the Hallstatt culture. As a result of the arid conditions and exceptional preservation, tattoos have been identified on mummies from several sites around the Tarim Basin, including Qäwrighul, Yanghai, Shengjindian, Shanpula (Sampul), Zaghunluq, and Qizilchoqa.

It has been asserted that the textiles found with the mummies are of an early European textile type based on close similarities to fragmentary textiles found in salt mines in Austria, dating from the second millennium BCE. Anthropologist Irene Good, a specialist in early Eurasian textiles, noted the woven diagonal twill pattern indicated the use of a rather sophisticated loom and said that the textile is "the easternmost known example of this kind of weaving technique". The cemetery at Yanbulaq contained 29 mummies which dated from 1100 to 500 BCE.

== Genetic studies ==
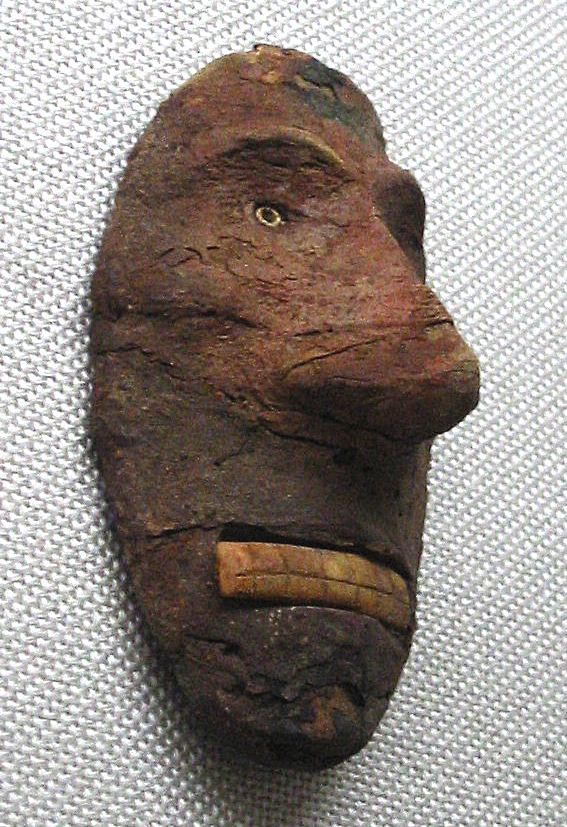
Mask from Lop Nur, China, 2000–1000 BCE

In 2007, the Chinese government allowed a National Geographic Society team headed by Spencer Wells to examine the mummies' DNA. Wells was able to extract undegraded DNA from the internal tissues. The scientists extracted enough material to suggest the Tarim Basin was continually inhabited from 2000 BCE to 300 BCE and preliminary results indicate the people, rather than having a single origin, originated from Europe, Mesopotamia, Indus Valley and other regions yet to be determined.

=== Haplogroups ===
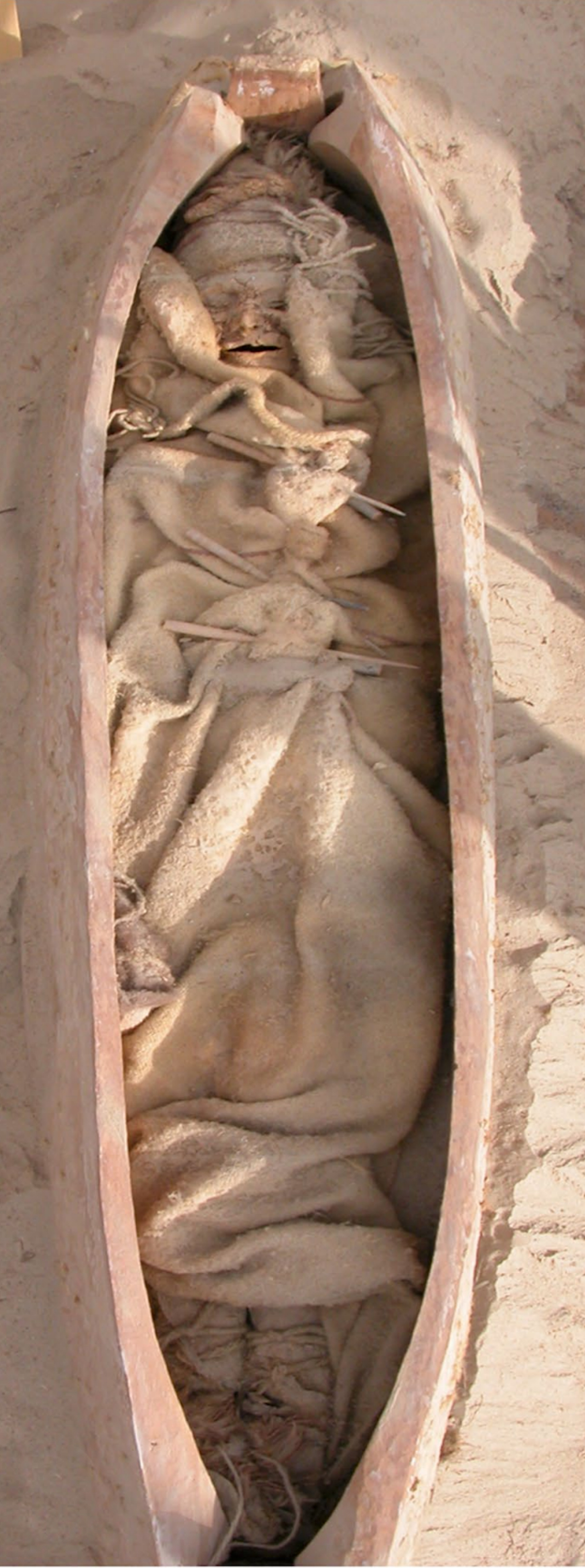
Burial XHM66 from Xiaohe cemetery, with boat-shaped coffin and mummified remains dressed in woollen garments.

A 2008 study by Jilin University showed that the Yuansha population has relatively close relationships with the modern populations of South Central Asia and Indus Valley, as well as with the ancient population of Chawuhu.

Between 2009 and 2015, the remains of 92 individuals found at the Xiaohe Tomb complex were analyzed for Y-DNA and mtDNA markers. Genetic analyses of the mummies showed that the maternal lineages of the Xiaohe people originated from both East Asia and West Eurasia, whereas the paternal lineages all originated from West Eurasia. The East Eurasian mtDNA carried by the Tarim mummies is mtDNA haplogroup C and the particular subclade found in the Tarim mummies originates from southeast Siberians like Udeghe and Evenks and not from East Asians, who carry mtDNA haplogroup C at a far lower rate and carry different subclades of mtDNA C.

Mitochondrial DNA analysis showed that maternal lineages carried by the people at Xiaohe included mtDNA haplogroups H, K, U5, U7, U2e, T and R*, which are now most common in West Eurasia. Also found were haplogroups common in modern populations from East Asia: B5, D and G2a. Haplogroups now common in Central Asian or Siberian populations included: C4 and C5. Haplogroups later regarded as typically South Asian included M5 and M*.

Li et al. (2010) found that nearly all – 11 out of 12 males, or around 92% – belonged to Y-DNA haplogroup R1a1a-M198, which is now most common in Northern India and Eastern Europe; the remaining one belonged to the exceptionally rare paragroup K* (M9) from Asia.

The geographic location of this admixing is unknown, although south Siberia is likely.

In 2021 the School of Life Sciences, Jilin University, China, analyzed 13 individuals from the Tarim basin, dated to c. 2100–1700 BCE, and assigned 2 to Y-haplogroup R1b1b-PH155/PH4796 (R1b1c in ISOGG2016), 1 – to Y-haplogroup R1-PF6136 (xR1a, xR1b1a).

Zhang et al. (2025) investigated a Late Bronze Age site in the far west of the Tarim Basin, dated 1600 to 1400 BC. Nearly all subjects belonged to Y-DNA haplogroup R-M17. One sample of Y-DNA extracted from a late Iron Age individual belonged to haplogroup Q1a2.

The samples of mtDNA extracted from the Late Bronze Age Tarim Basin belonged to H27e (four samples), H11b, U4a1, U4c1, T2b34 (two samples), N1a1a1a1, H5b, U2e3, U5b2a1a2, U4a2, H91, W1-T119C, U2e1e, T2d, U5a1b1, R1b1, H6a1a, HV14, T2a1b1, R1b*. Two samples of mtDNA extracted from late Iron Age individuals belonged to haplogroup A+T152C!+T16362C and A2d1.

=== Autosomal DNA ===
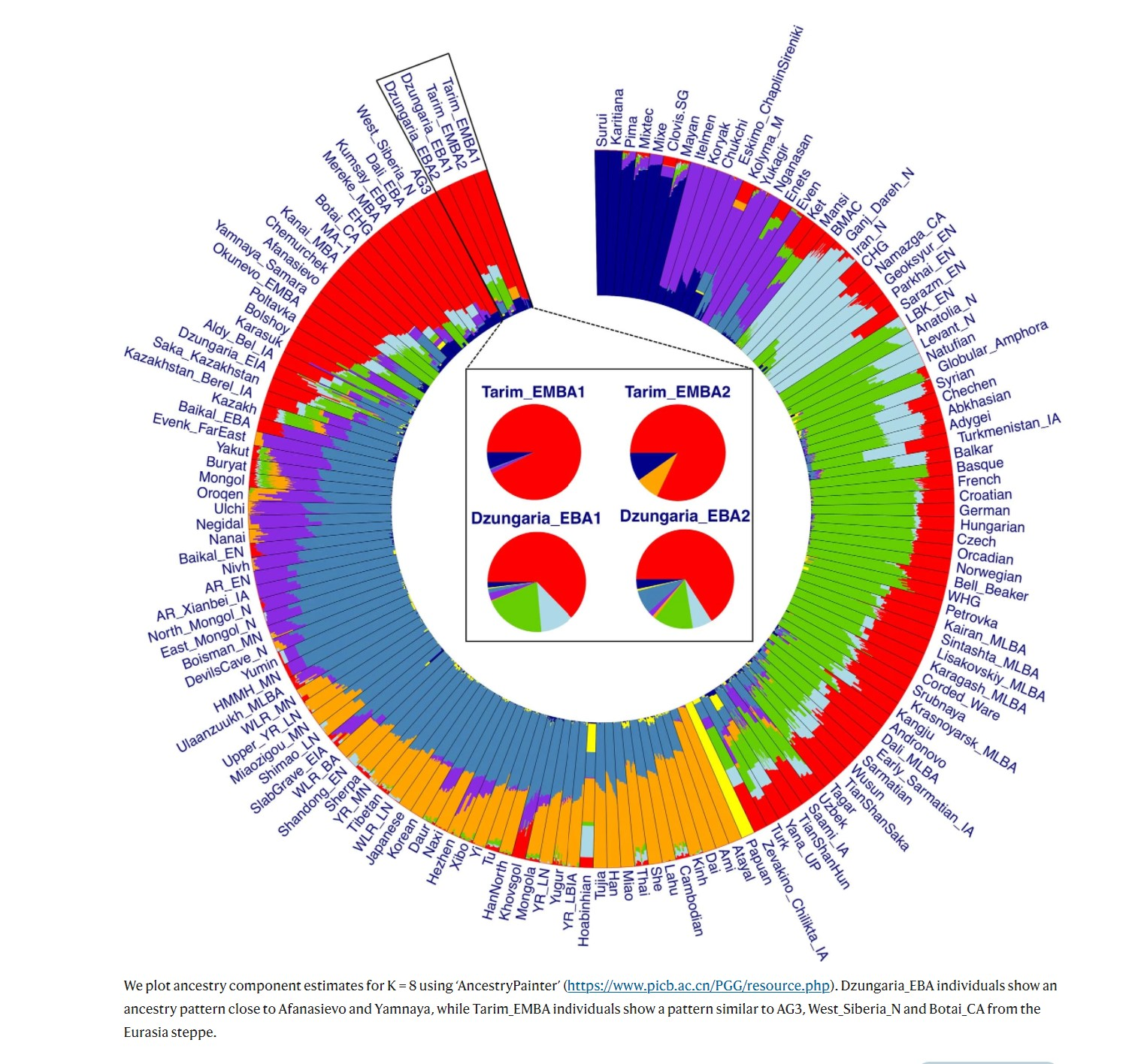
Frequency of Eurasian ancestral components in the context of the early Tarim mummies. ANE-like ancestry, maximized in the Paleolithic Afontova Gora 3 specimen as well as in the "Tarim_EMBA1" samples, is displayed in red.

A 2021 genetic study on the Early Bronze Age Tarim mummies (13 mummies, including 11 from Xiaohe Cemetery, ranging from 2,135 to 1,623 BCE) found that they were most closely related to an earlier identified group called the Ancient North Eurasians, particularly the population represented by the Afontova Gora 3 specimen (AG3), genetically displaying "high affinity" with it. The genetic profile of the Afontova Gora 3 individual represented about 72% of the ancestry of the Tarim mummies from Xiaohe, while the remaining 28% of their ancestry was derived from Ancient Northeast Asians (ANA, Early Bronze Age Baikal populations). Tarim_EMBA mummies from Beifang have a slightly higher amount of ANA ancestry and can be modelled as having 89% Xiaohe-like ancestry and about 11% ANA ancestry. The Tarim_EMBA mummies are thus one of the rare Holocene populations who derive most of their ancestry from the Ancient North Eurasians (ANE, specifically the Mal'ta and Afontova Gora populations), despite their distance in time (around 14,000 years). More than any other ancient population, the Tarim mummies can be considered as "the best representatives" of the Ancient North Eurasians.

When compared with other ANE-derived Holocene poulations, the early Tarim mummies from Xiaohe ("Tarim_EMBA1") display the highest genetic affinity to Middle Holocene hunter-gatherers from the Altai Mountains (5500–3500 BCE). Tarim_EMBA1 and Altai hunter-gatherers can be successfully modeled from each other in both directions: Altai hunter-gatherers can be modeled as a 2-source admixture between Tarim_EMBA1 and Ancient Paleo-Siberians, while conversely, Tarim_EMBA1 can be modeled as an even mixture of Altai hunter-gatherers and the ANE-genome AG3 from Afontova Gora.

Tests on their genetic legacy also found that several groups in Central Asia and Xinjiang derived varying degrees of ancestry from a population related to the Early Bronze Age Tarim mummies. Pamiri Tajik groups show the relative highest affinity with the Tarim_EMBA mummies, although their main ancestry is linked to BMAC and Iron Age groups from Central Asia.

Zhang et al. (2025) examined a Late Bronze Age site in the far west of the Tarim Basin, dated 1600 to 1400 BC. Its inhabitants overwhelmingly descended from the Sintashta and Andronovo population, with additional genetic contributions from the Bactria–Margiana Archaeological Complex (10%) and Early Bronze Age Tarim mummies (12%). Towards the end of the Iron Age, when the cities founded in the Western Tarim Basin became cosmopolitan centers of the Silk Road, this Andronovo-related ancestry is no longer detectable.

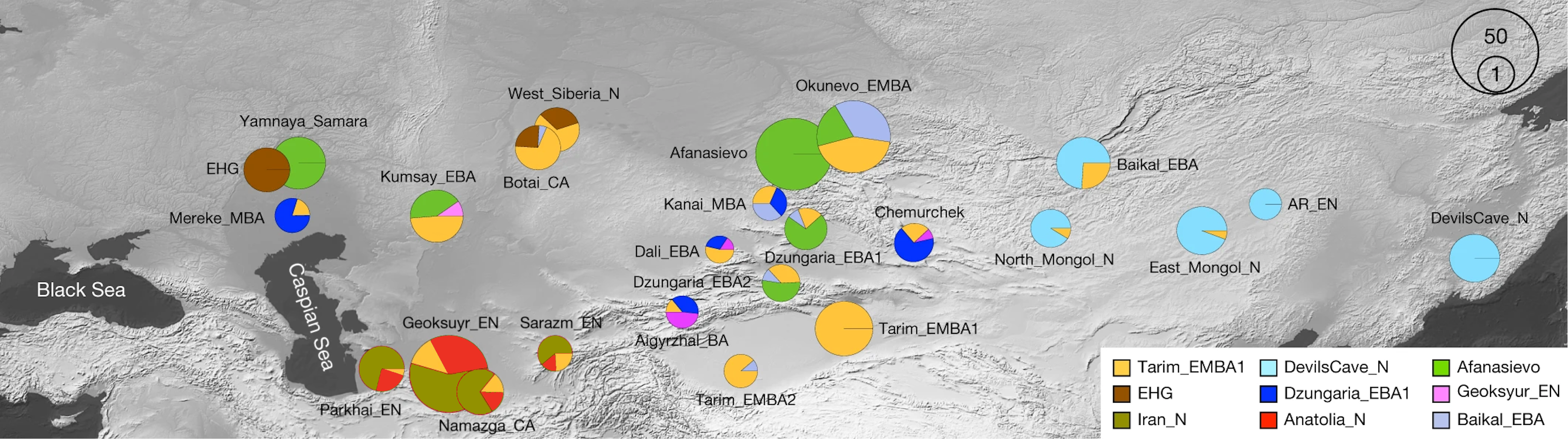
Genetic ancestry and admixture of ancient populations of Eurasia. The Tarim mummies ( ) are unrelated to the Afanasievo culture ( ). They are instead mainly descended from the Ancient North Eurasians (ANE, 72%), with relatively minor Baikal EBA admixture (28%), and remained essentially in genetic isolation. "The Tarim mummies' so-called Western physical features are probably due to their connection to the Pleistocene ANE gene pool".

== Posited origins ==
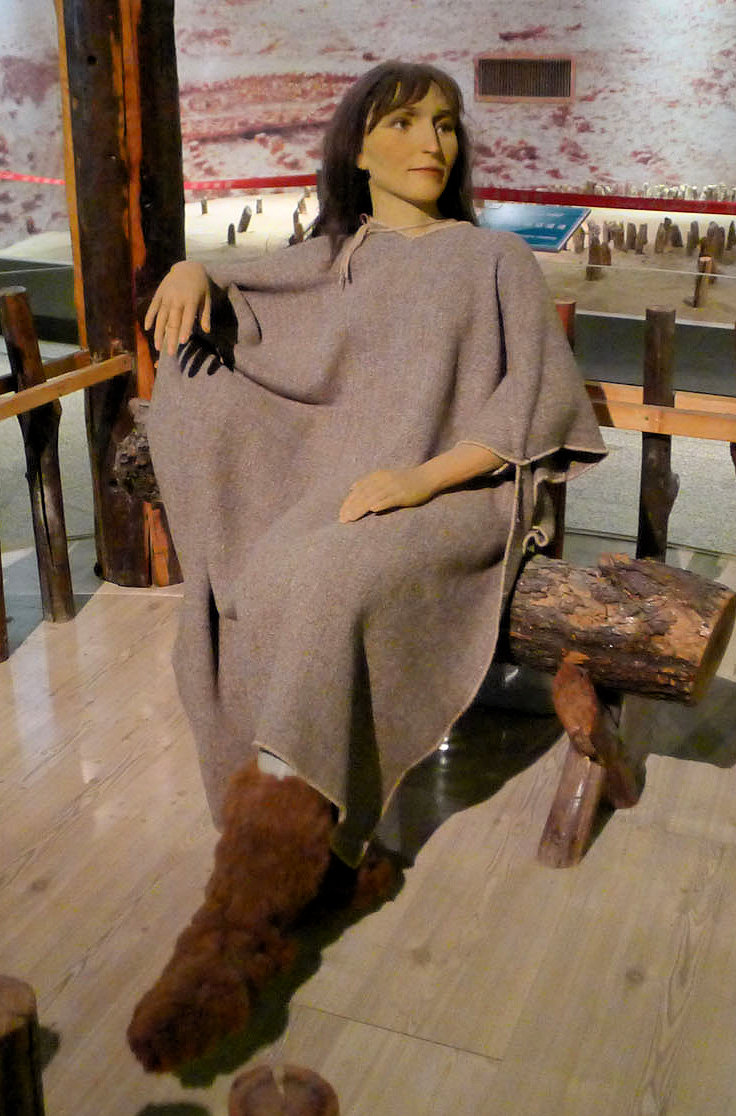
Reconstruction of a female individual from Xiaohe Cemetery. Xinjiang Museum. The Tarim mummies are considered as the "best representatives" of Ancient North Eurasians.

Mallory and Mair (2000) propose the movement of at least two "Caucasian" physical types into the Tarim Basin. The authors associate these types with the Tocharian and Iranian (Saka) branches of the Indo-European language family, respectively. However, archaeology and linguistics professor Elizabeth Wayland Barber cautions against assuming the mummies spoke Tocharian, noting a gap of about a thousand years between the mummies and the documented Tocharians: "people can change their language at will, without altering a single gene or freckle".

On the other hand, linguistics professor Ronald Kim argues that the amount of divergence between the attested Tocharian languages necessitates that Proto-Tocharian must have preceded their attestation by a millennium or so. This would coincide with the timeframe during which the Tarim Basin culture was in the region.

In 1995, Mair claimed that "the earliest mummies in the Tarim Basin were exclusively Caucasoid, or Europoid" with east Asian migrants arriving in the eastern portions of the Tarim Basin around 3,000 years ago while the Uyghur peoples arrived around the year 842. In trying to trace the origins of these populations, Victor Mair's team suggested that they may have arrived in the region by way of the Pamir Mountains about 5,000 years ago.

Mair has claimed that:

The new finds are also forcing a reexamination of old Chinese books that describe historical or legendary figures of great height, with deep-set blue or green eyes, long noses, full beards, and red or blond hair. Scholars have traditionally scoffed at these accounts, but it now seems that they may be accurate.

Mair and Mallory's research have been extensively criticized within academia for their role in providing an implicit foundation for white supremacy and Nazism within scholarship. The phenotypes found within the mummies are not homogeneous and many do not align with "European" features. Furthermore, physical features alone are not grounds for determining migration patterns and the cranial features alone examined in the remains outside of Tarim cannot be used to determine phenotypes. Mallory has since distanced himself from earlier ties to racist publications.

There are also cultural, genetic, and phenotypic connections to the modern Uyghurs. Thornton and Schurr demonstrated that the broader linguistic replacement by Uyghurs cannot be construed as outright replacement. Uyghur phenotypes themselves have been previously (and inconsistently) classified as "European", "Mongoloid" and "Caucusoid" (classifications now widely recognized by anthropologists as pseudoscientific). Furthermore, traditional Uyghur techniques for producing clothing are understudied; in particular with regards to the felting process and its relationship to that of the clothing found on the mummies.

In 1995 Mair also wrote that "I also hope to bring some of the corpses for a traveling exhibition to several museums in the United States and Europe. That way, modern men and women who are curious can see for themselves what their ancestors of the hundred-and-thirtieth generation back looked like". A passage criticized by Thornton and Schurr for the emphasis on placing the mummies as ancestral to Europeans and fulfilling a Chinese nationalist agenda over that of the Uyghurs.

B. E. Hemphill's biodistance analysis of cranial metrics (as cited in Larsen 2002 and Schurr 2001) has questioned the identification of the Tarim Basin population as European, noting that the earlier population forms their own distinct cluster and having closer affinities to two specimens from the Harappan site of the Indus Valley civilisation, while the later Tarim population displays closer affinities with the Oxus River valley population.

Han Kangxin, who examined the skulls of 302 mummies, found the closest relatives of the earlier Tarim Basin population in the populations of the Afanasevo culture situated immediately north of the Tarim Basin and the Andronovo culture that spanned Kazakhstan and reached southwards into West Central Asia and the Altai.

It is the Afanasevo culture to which Mallory & Mair (2000:294–296, 314–318) trace the earliest Bronze Age settlers of the Tarim and Turpan basins. The Afanasevo culture (c. 3500–2500 BCE) displays cultural and genetic connections with the Indo-European-associated cultures of the Eurasian Steppe yet predates the specifically Indo-Iranian-associated Andronovo culture (c. 2000–900 BCE) enough to isolate the Tocharian languages from Indo-Iranian linguistic innovations like satemization.

Mair concluded:

From the evidence available, we have found that during the first 1,000 years after the Loulan Beauty, the only settlers in the Tarim Basin were Caucasoid. East Asian peoples only began showing up in the eastern portions of the Tarim Basin about 3,000 years ago, Mair said, while the Uighur peoples arrived after the collapse of the Orkon Uighur Kingdom, largely based in modern day Mongolia, around the year 842.

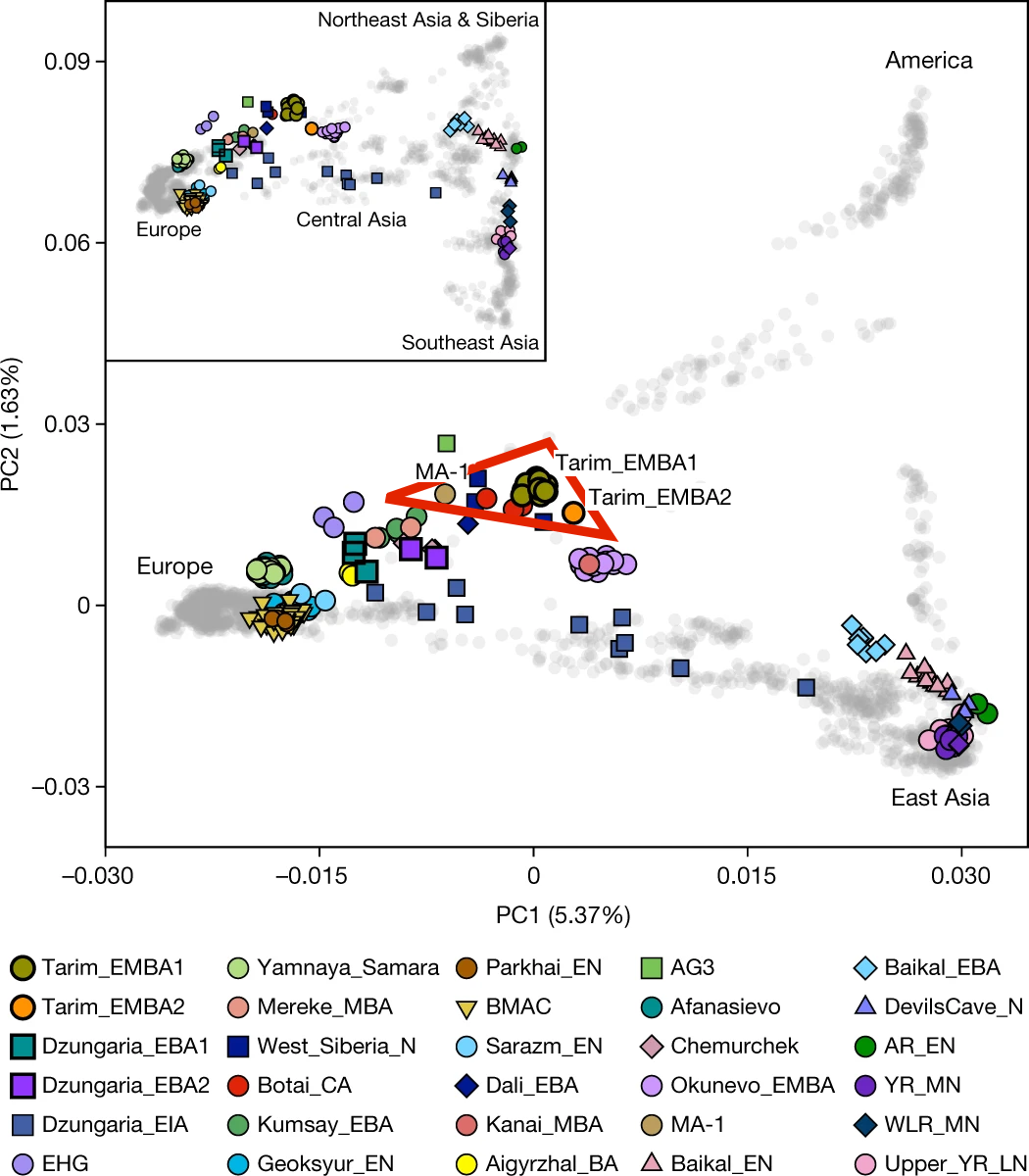
The Tarim Mummies have a strong genetic proximity with Ancient North Eurasians (here represented by the MA-1 human specimen of the Mal'ta-Buret' culture (c. 24,000 BP)

Hemphill & Mallory (2003) note the existence of an additional physical type at Alwighul (700–1 BCE) and Krorän (200 CE) different from the earlier one found at Qäwrighul (1800 BCE) and Yanbulaq (1100–500 BCE), while finding no evidence of significant Steppe-related contributions to these remains:

The results fail to demonstrate close phenetic affinities between the early inhabitants of Qäwrighul and any of the proposed sources for immigrants to the Tarim Basin. The absence of close affinities to outside populations renders it unlikely that the human remains recovered from Qäwrighul represent the unadmixed remains of colonists from the Afanasievo or Andronovo cultures of the steppe lands, or inhabitants of the urban centers of the Oxus civilization of Bactria. ... This study confirms the assertion of Han [1998] that the occupants of Alwighul and Krorän are not derived from proto-European steppe populations, but share closest affinities with Eastern Mediterranean populations. Further, the results show that such Eastern Mediterraneans may also be found at the urban centers of the Oxus civilization in the north Bactrian oasis to the west. Affinities are especially close between Krorän, the latest of the Xinjiang samples, and Sapalli, the earliest of the Bactrian samples, while Alwighul and later samples from Bactria exhibit more distant phenetic affinities. This pattern may reflect a possible major shift in interregional contacts in Central Asia in the early centuries of the second millennium BCE. ... Nevertheless, there is no support for the hypothesis that steppe populations contributed significantly to Bronze Age populations of the Tarim Basin. Despite numerous similarities between Afanasievo and Andronovo artifacts and Bronze Age artifacts from Xinjiang (Bunker, 1998; Chen and Hiebert, 1995; Kuzmina, 1998; Mei and Shell, 1998; Peng, 1998), all analyses of phenetic relationships consistently reveal a profound phenetic separation between steppe samples and the samples from the Tarim Basin (Qäwrighul, Alwighul, and Krorän).

Mair's work has faced criticism from a variety of anthropologists including Zimmer, Schurr, and Thornton. Zimmer has stated on Mair's work:

It should be clearly stated at once that those mummies do in fact present the scientific community with a number of big questions and most intriguing problems. There can be no doubt about the seriousness of Dr. Mair's scholary aims, but what pleads for extreme carefulness is his obvious emotional excitement which seems to have let him to a number of all too rash assumptions. The mixture of physical anthropology with human history has been discredited to the bottom by political misuse, not only but most spectacular in the recent past. Unwise intermingling of natural and cultural factors is still a major factor in nourishing racism all over the world in our own days.

Zhang et al. (2021) proposed that the 'Western' like features of the earlier Tarim mummies could be attributed to their Ancient North Eurasian ancestry. Previous craniometric analyses on the early Tarim mummies found that they formed a distinct cluster of their own, and clustered with neither the European-related Steppe pastoralists from the Andronovo and Afanasievo culture, nor with inhabitants of the Western Asian BMAC culture, nor East Asian populations further East.

== Historical records and associated texts ==
=== Chinese sources ===
Western Regions (Hsi-yu; Chinese: 西域; pinyin: Xīyù; Wade–Giles: Hsi^{1}-yü^{4}) is the historical name in China, between the 3rd century BCE and 8th century CE for regions west of Yumen Pass, including the Tarim and Central Asia.

Some of the peoples of the Western Regions were described in Chinese sources as having full beards, red or blond hair, deep-set blue or green eyes and high noses. According to Chinese sources, the city states of the Tarim reached the height of their political power during the 3rd to 4th centuries CE, although this may actually indicate an increase in Chinese involvement in the Tarim, after the collapse of the Kushan Empire.

=== The Rouzhi ===
Reference to the Rouzhi name was possibly made around 7th century BCE by the Chinese philosopher Guan Zhong, though his book is generally considered to be a later forgery. Guan Zhong described a group called either the Yuzhi 禺氏 or Niuzhi 牛氏 as a people from the north-west who supplied jade to the Chinese from the nearby mountains of Yuzhi 禺氏 at Gansu.

After the Rouzhi experienced a series of major defeats at the hands of the Xiongnu, during the 2nd century BCE, a group known as the Greater Rouzhi migrated to Bactria, where they established the Kushan Empire. By the 1st century CE, the Kushan Empire had expanded significantly and may have annexed part of the Tarim Basin.

=== Tocharian languages ===
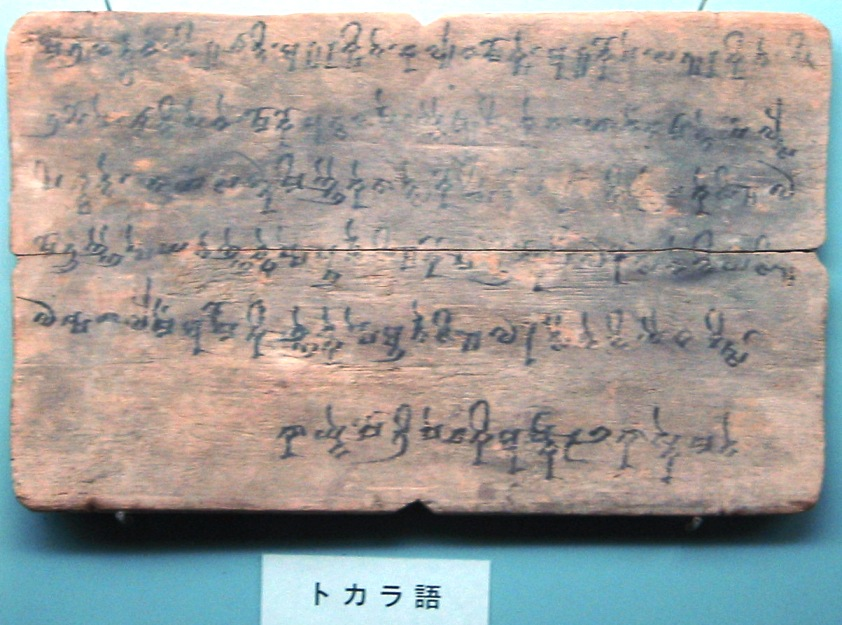
Wooden tablet with an inscription showing Tocharian B in its Brahmic form. Kucha, China, 5th–8th century (Tokyo National Museum)

The degree of differentiation between the language known to modern scholars as Tocharian A (or by the endonym Ārśi-käntwa; "tongue of Ārśi") and Tocharian B (Kuśiññe; [adjective] "of Kucha, Kuchean"), and the absence of evidence for these beyond the Tarim, tends to indicate that a common, proto-Tocharian language existed in the Tarim during the second half of the 1st millennium BCE. Tocharian is attested in documents between the 3rd and 9th centuries CE, although the first known epigraphic evidence dates to the 6th century CE.

Although the Tarim mummies preceded the Tocharian texts by around 2,000 years, their shared geographical location and links to Western Eurasia have led many scholars to suggest that the mummies were related to the Tocharian peoples.

== Arguments for cultural transmission from West to East ==
The possible presence of speakers of Indo-European languages in the Tarim Basin by about 2000 BCE could, if confirmed, be interpreted as evidence that cultural exchanges occurred among Indo-European and Chinese populations at a very early date. It has been suggested that such techniques as chariot warfare and bronze-making may have been transmitted to the east by these Indo-European nomads. Mallory and Mair also say thatt finds of metal artifacts in China from earlier than about 2000 BCE "are exceedingly few, simple and, puzzlingly, already made of alloyed copper (and hence questionable)".

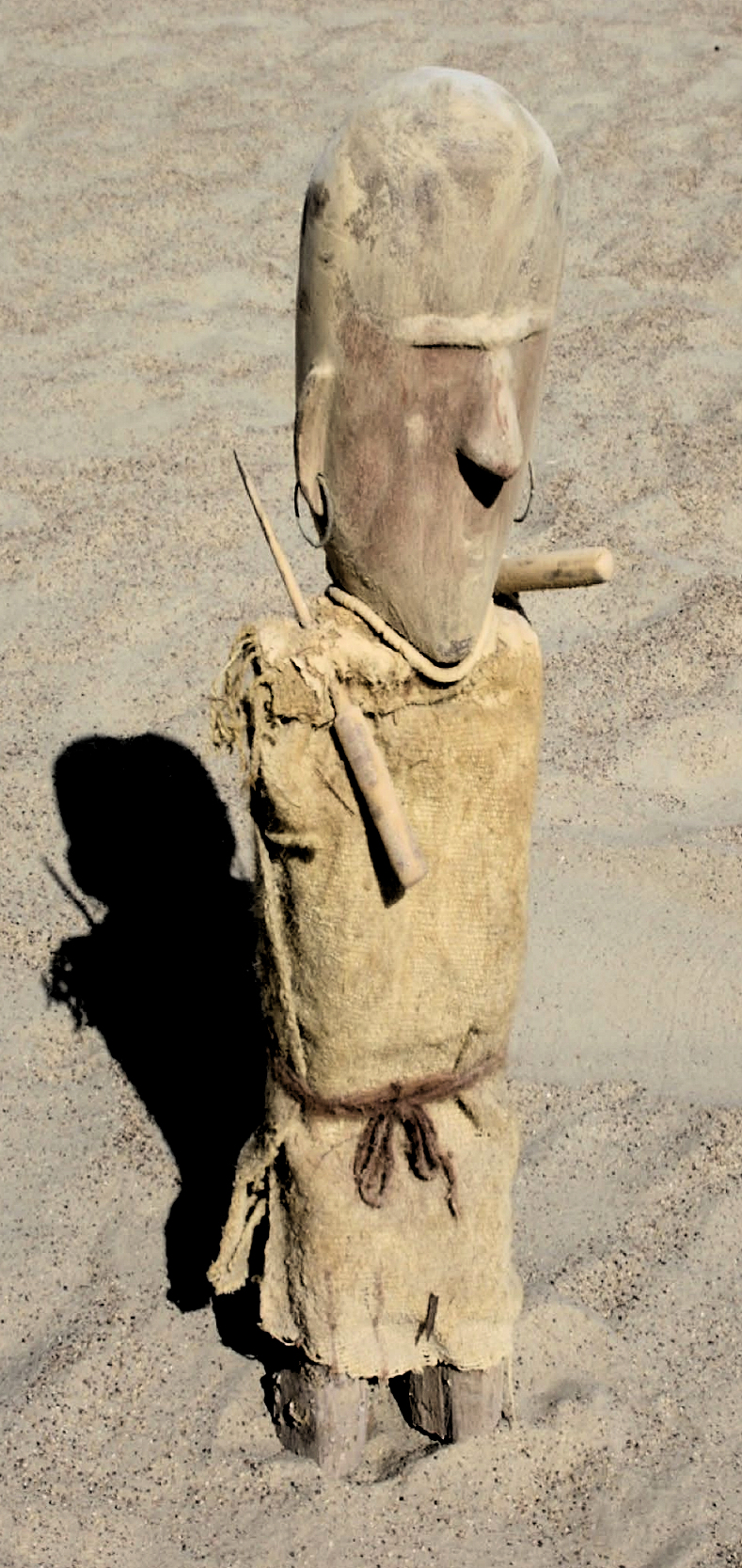
Wooden sculpture from Xiaohe cemetery

While stressing that the argument as to whether bronze technology travelled from China to the West or that "the earliest bronze technology in China was stimulated by contacts with western steppe cultures", is far from settled in scholarly circles, they suggest that the evidence so far favours the latter scenario. However, the culture and the technology in the northwest region of Tarim basin were less advanced than that in the East China of Yellow River-Erlitou (c. 2070–1600 BCE) or Majiayao culture (c. 3100–2600 BCE), the earliest bronze-using cultures in China, which implies that the northwest region did not use copper or any metal until bronze technology was introduced to the region by the Shang dynasty in about 1600 BCE. The earliest bronze artifacts in China are found at the Majiayao site (between 3100 and 2700 BCE), and it is from this location and time period that Chinese Bronze Age spread. Bronze metallurgy in China originated in what is referred to as the Erlitou (Wade–Giles: Erh-li-t'ou) period, which some historians argue places it within the range of dates controlled by the Shang dynasty.

Others believe the Erlitou sites belong to the preceding Xia (Wade–Giles: Hsia) dynasty. The US National Gallery of Art defines the Chinese Bronze Age as the "period between about 2000 BC and 771 BC", which begins with Erlitou culture and ends abruptly with the disintegration of Western Zhou rule. Though that provides a concise frame of reference, it overlooks the continued importance of bronze in Chinese metallurgy and culture. Since that was significantly later than the discovery of bronze in Mesopotamia, bronze technology could have been imported, rather than being discovered independently in China. However, there is reason to believe that bronzework developed inside China, separately from outside influence.

The Chinese official Zhang Qian, who visited Bactria and Sogdiana in 126 BCE, made the first known Chinese report on many regions west of China. He believed to have discerned Greek influences in some of the kingdoms. He named Parthia "Ānxī" (Chinese: 安息), a transcription of "Arshak" (Arsaces), the name of the founder of Parthian dynasty. Zhang Qian clearly identified Parthia as an advanced urban civilization that farmed grain and grapes and manufactured silver coins and leather goods. Zhang Qian equated Parthia's level of advancement to the cultures of Dayuan in Ferghana and Daxia in Bactria.

The supplying of Tarim Basin jade to China from ancient times is well established, according to Liu (2001): "It is well known that ancient Chinese rulers had a strong attachment to jade. All of the jade items excavated from the tomb of Fuhao of the Shang dynasty by Zheng Zhenxiang, more than 750 pieces, were from Khotan in modern Xinjiang. As early as the mid-first millennium BCE the Yuezhi engaged in the jade trade, of which the major consumers were the rulers of agricultural China."

== Controversies ==
According to Ed Wong's New York Times article from 2008, Mair was prohibited from leaving the country with 52 genetic samples. However, a Chinese scientist clandestinely sent him half a dozen, on which an Italian geneticist performed tests.

Since then, China has prohibited foreign scientists from conducting research on the mummies. As Wong says, "Despite the political issues, excavations of the grave sites are continuing."

== See also ==
- Pazyryk culture
- Pontic–Caspian steppe
- Dzungarian Gate
- Gushi culture
- Tocharian clothing
- Kurgan hypothesis

== Sources ==
- Barber, Elizabeth Wayland (1999). The Mummies of Ürümchi. London: Pan Books. ISBN 0-330-36897-4.
- Baumer, Christoph (2000). Southern Silk Road: In the Footsteps of Sir Aurel Stein and Sven Hedin. Bangkok: White Orchid Books. ISBN 974-8304-38-8.
- Davis-Kimball, Jeannine; Behan, Mona (2002). Warrior Women: An Archaeologist's Search for History's Hidden Heroines (1stTrade ed.). New York: Warner Books. ISBN 0-446-67983-6.
- Hemphill, Brian E.; Mallory, J. P. (19 September 2003). "Horse-mounted invaders from the Russo-Kazakh steppe or agricultural colonists from Western Central Asia? A craniometric investigation of the Bronze Age settlement of Xinjiang". American Journal of Physical Anthropology. 125 (3): 199–222. doi:10.1002/ajpa.10354. PMID 15197817.
- Larsen, Clark Spencer (2002). "Bioarchaeology: The Lives and Lifestyles of Past People". Journal of Archaeological Research. 10 (2) (published June 2002): 119–166. doi:10.1023/A:1015267705803. S2CID 145654453.
- Li, Shuicheng (1999). "A Discussion of Sino-Western Cultural Contact and Exchange in the Second Millennium BC Based on Recent Archeological Discoveries". Sino-Platonic Papers (97) (published December 1999).
- Light, Nathan (1999a). "Hidden Discourses of Race: Imagining Europeans in China". Archived from the original on 15 May 2008.
- Light, Nathan (March–April 1999b). "Tabloid Archaeology: Is Television Trivializing Science?". Discovering Archaeology. pp. 98–101. Archived from the original on 20 September 2006.
- Liu, Xinru (2001). "Migration and Settlement of the Yuezhi-Kushan. Interaction and Interdependence of Nomadic and Sedentary Societies". Journal of World History. 12 (2): 261–292. doi:10.1353/jwh.2001.0034. S2CID 162211306.
- Mallory, J. P.; Mair, Victor H. (2000). The Tarim Mummies: Ancient China and the Mystery of the Earliest Peoples from the West. London: Thames & Hudson.
- Pliny the Elder. The Natural History.
- Schurr, Theodore G. (2001). "Tracking Genes Across the Globe: A review of Genes, Peoples, and Languages, by Luigi Luca Cavalli-Sforza". American Scientist. Vol. 89, no. 1 (published January–February 2001). Archived from the original on 14 February 2017.
- Chengzhi, Xie; Chunxiang, Li; Yinqiu, Cui; Dawei, Cai; Haijing, Wang; Hong, Zhu; Hui, Zhou (2007). "Mitochondrial DNA analysis of ancient Sampula population in Xinjiang". Progress in Natural Science. 17 (8): 927–933. doi:10.1080/10002007088537493.
- Yu, Taishan (2003). A Comprehensive History of Western Regions (2nd ed.). Zhengzhou: Zhongzhou Guji Press. ISBN 7-5348-1266-6.
- Zhang, Fan (November 2021). "The genomic origins of the Bronze Age Tarim Basin mummies". Nature. 599 (7884): 256–261. Bibcode:2021Natur.599..256Z. doi:10.1038/s41586-021-04052-7. ISSN 1476-4687. PMC 8580821. PMID 34707286.
- Freedman, B. J. (1984). "For debate... Caucasian". British Medical Journal. 288 (6418). Routledge: 696–98. doi:10.1136/bmj.288.6418.696. PMC 1444385. PMID 6421437. For a contrast with the "Mongolic" or Mongoloid race, see footnote #4 pp. 58–59 in Beckwith, Christopher (2009). Empires of the Silk Road: A History of Central Eurasia from the Bronze Age to the Present. Princeton and Oxford: Princeton University Press. ISBN 978-0-691-13589-2. OCLC 800915872. Europid, or Europoid)
- Pearson, Roger (1985). Anthropological glossary. R. E. Krieger Pub. Co. p. 79. ISBN 978-0-89874-510-8.
- Templeton, A. (2016). "Evolution and Notions of Human Race". In Losos, J.; Lenski, R. (eds.). How Evolution Shapes Our Lives: Essays on Biology and Society. Princeton; Oxford: Princeton University Press. pp. 346–361. doi:10.2307/j.ctv7h0s6j.26. "... the answer to the question whether races exist in humans is clear and unambiguous: no."
- Wagner, Jennifer K.; Yu, Joon-Ho; Ifekwunigwe, Jayne O.; Harrell, Tanya M.; Bamshad, Michael J.; Royal, Charmaine D. (February 2017). "Anthropologists' views on race, ancestry, and genetics". American Journal of Physical Anthropology. 162 (2): 318–327. Bibcode:2017AJPA..162..318W. doi:10.1002/ajpa.23120. PMC 5299519. PMID 27874171.
- American Association of Physical Anthropologists (27 March 2019). "AAPA Statement on Race and Racism". American Association of Physical Anthropologists.
- Pickering, Robert (2009). The Use of Forensic Anthropology. CRC Press. p. 82. ISBN 978-1-4200-6877-1.
- Herbst, Philip (15 June 1997). The color of words: an encyclopaedic dictionary of ethnic bias in the United States. Intercultural Press. ISBN 978-1-877864-97-1. "Though discredited as an anthropological term and not recommended in most editorial guidelines, it is still heard and used, for example, as a category on forms asking for ethnic identification. It is also still used for police blotters (the abbreviated Cauc may be heard among police) and appears elsewhere as a euphemism. Its synonym, Caucasoid, also once used in anthropology but now dated and considered pejorative, is disappearing."
- Mukhopadhyay, Carol C. (30 June 2008). "Getting Rid of the Word 'Caucasian'". In Mica Pollock (ed.). Everyday Antiracism: Getting Real About Race in School. New Press. pp. 14–. ISBN 978-1-59558-567-7. "Yet there is one striking exception in our modern racial vocabulary: the term 'Caucasian'. Despite being a remnant of a discredited theory of racial classification, the term has persisted into the twenty-first century, within as well as outside of the educational community. It is high time we got rid of the word Caucasian. Some might protest that it is 'only a label'. But language is one of the most systematic, subtle, and significant vehicles for transmitting racial ideology. Terms that describe imagined groups, such as Caucasian, encapsulate those beliefs. Every time we use them and uncritically expose students to them, we are reinforcing rather than dismantling the old racialized worldview. Using the word Caucasian invokes scientific racism, the false idea that races are naturally occurring, biologically ranked subdivisions of the human species and that Caucasians are the superior race. Beyond this, the label Caucasian can even convey messages about which groups have culture and are entitled to recognition as Americans."
