= Qäwrighul culture =

Archaeological culture

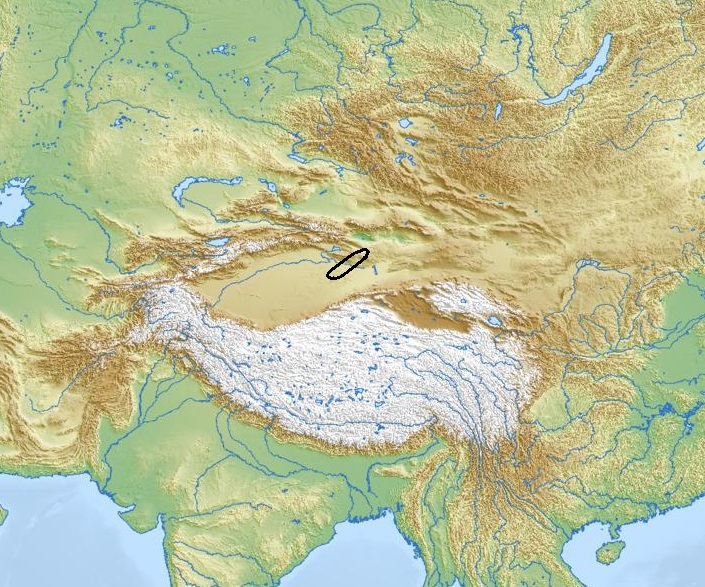
- Geographical range: Tarim Basin
- Period: Late Bronze Age
- Dates: ca. 2100–1500 BC

The Qäwrighul culture (after the Tarim Basin cemetery of Qäwrighul , also named 古墓溝 Gumugou in Chinese) is a late Bronze Age culture which flourished along the Kongque River in Xinjiang from ca. 2100 BC to 1500 BC, and is one of the cultures of the Tarim mummies. It is considered as part of the Xiaohe culture, with its Xiaohe cemetery slightly to the south.

The Qäwrighul culture is primarily known for its cemeteries. It is considered as the oldest of the Tarim mummies burial sites, going back to 2135–1939 BCE for its lowest layers. The best attested of these are the cemeteries of Qäwrighul itself, in which at least forty-two burials have been uncovered. Qäwrighul tombs are divided into two types.

== Discovery ==
The Qäwrighul cemetery, also known as Gumugou, lies on the north bank of the dry Kongque River in the eastern Tarim Basin, in present-day Xinjiang, northwestern China. It is about 85 kilometres (53 miles) west of the ruins of the ancient city of Loulan. Archaeologist Aurel Stein visited the cemetery in the early 20th century, recorded it as the "LS Cemetery" and excavated several graves there.

A much larger excavation followed in 1979, when the Archaeological Institute of the Xinjiang Academy of Social Science excavated 42 graves. The people buried at Qäwrighul included men, women and children, and several bodies were naturally preserved as mummies.

The oldest known Tarim mummies include bodies from the lowest layers at Qäwrighul. These burials have been dated to between 2135 and 1939 BCE, about 4,000 years ago. They are the earliest dated mummies from the Bronze Age cemeteries that archaeologists group together as the Xiaohe archaeological horizon.

== Burials ==
=== Type 1 burials ===
The first type of Qäwrighul tomb is characterized by shaft graves. These included evidence of wooden planking. Sometimes, wooden poles were erected on the western and eastern ends of the chamber. The deceased in these tombs were buried in an extended position with their heads to the east. They bore felt hats and were wrapped in woolen fabrics. On their chests, twigs of ephedra have been discovered. Grave goods in these tombs include bone ornaments, antler awls, wooden basins, stone implements, and bowls. Although traces of metal, both copper and bronze, have been discovered, no evidence of ceramics have been found. The physical type of these burials have been connected those of the earlier Afanasievo culture.

=== Type 2 burials ===
The second type of Qäwrighul was characterised by shaft graves surrounded by concentric circles of poles. Other poles radiate out to form what appears to be solar symbols. The burials are exclusively confined to males. The forms of pole circles have been compared to the stone circles characteristic of the Andronovo culture. The physical type of these burials are also similar to those of the Andronovo culture.

=== Interpretation of the burial types ===
The differences of the two types of Qäwrighul burial has been variously interpreted. Some have explained them as belonging to people with different status belonging to the same culture, while others have explained them as belonging chronologically separate cultures belonging to different populations.

== Characteristics ==
The preservation of the bodies range from poor to incredible well preserved mummies. Which is a result of the arid sandy conditions of the area.

From the limited remains of the Qäwrighul culture it appears that their economy included wheat, sheep, goat and horses. Deer and fish have also been discovered.

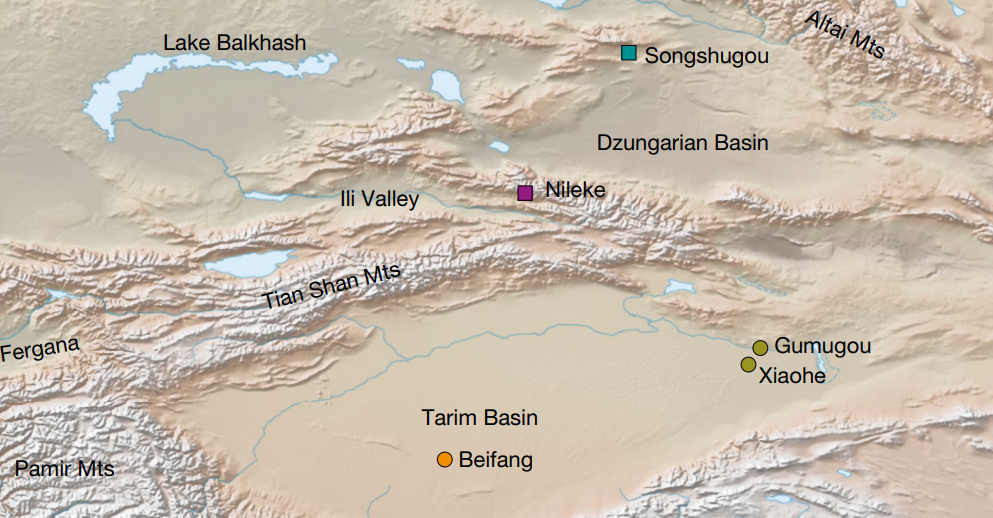
Site of Gumugou within the Tarim Basin area

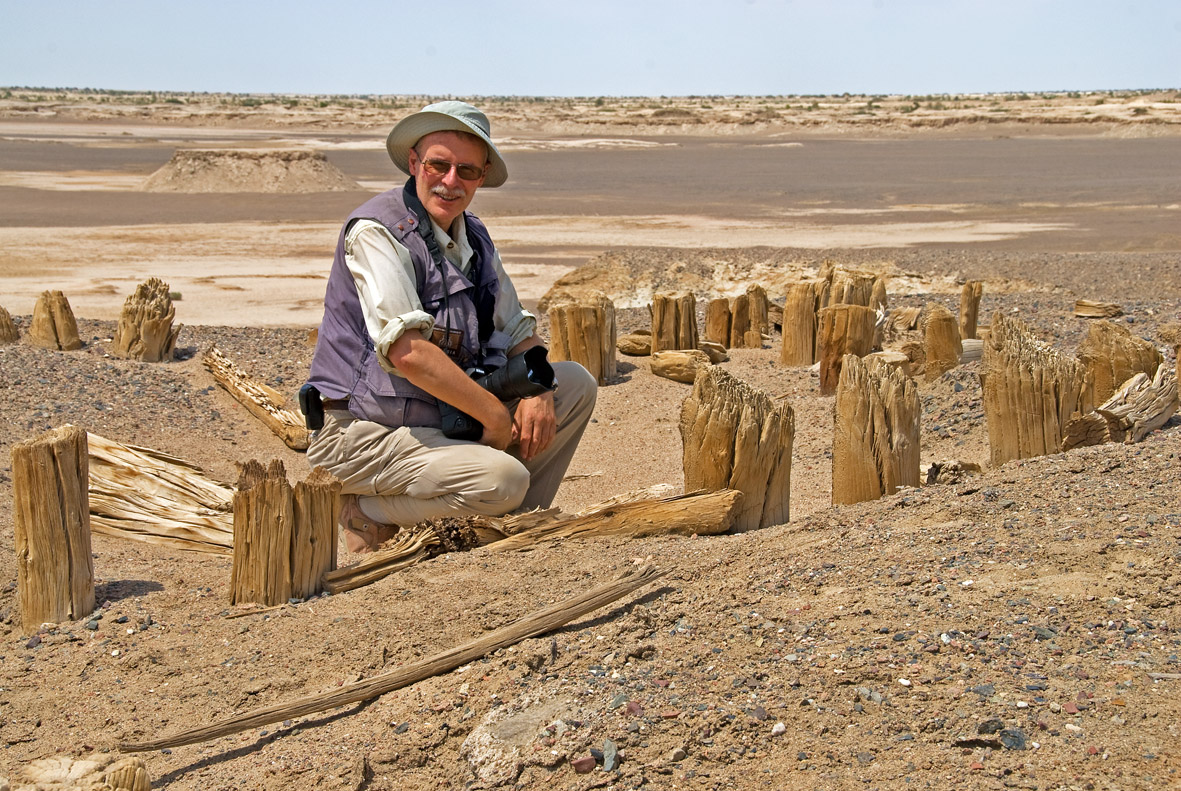
Historian Christoph Baumer at Bronze Age graveyard Käwrigul (Gumugou), Lop Nur, 2009

According to Mallory & Adams (1997) the remains of the Qäwrighul culture are Europoid. It is argued that these are the earliest evidence for the presence of Europoid populations in the Tarim Basin. Its burials in shaft-graves, lined with stone or timber, and surrounded by enclosures, and the presence of offering-places associated with the heads and legs of horses, are strikingly similar to the graves of cultures located further west on the Eurasian Steppe. The physical type of the Qäwrighul people is similar to that of people of the earlier Afanasievo culture, and people of the contemporary Andronovo culture. On this basis, the Qäwrighul culture has been considered a possible candidate as an ancestor of the Tocharians. A revised craniometric analyses by Hemphill & Mallory (2004) on the early Tarim mummies (Qäwrighul) failed to demonstrate close phenetic affinities to "Europoid populations", but rather found that they formed their own cluster, distinct from the European-related Steppe pastoralists of the Andronovo and Afanasievo cultures, or the inhabitants of the Western Asian BMAC culture.

Autosomal genetic evidence suggests that the earliest Tarim people arose from locals of primarily Ancient North Eurasian descent with significant Northeast Asian admixture. These mummies have previously been suggested to be of Tocharian origin, but recent evidence suggests that the mummies belonged to a distinct population unrelated to later Indo-European pastoralists, such as Afanasievo.

=== Transmission of bronze technology ===
Archaeological finds at the Gumugou cemetery have reinforced the theory of the transmission of bronze technology through contacts between the Afanasievo culture and Xinjiang, with further transmission to the Gansu region in northwestern China (Majiayao culture and Qijia culture).

== See also ==
- Chust culture
- Yaz culture
- Vakhsh culture
- Bishkent culture
- Tazabagyab culture
- Swat culture

== Sources ==
- Kuzmina, Elena E. (2007). Mallory, J. P. (ed.). The Origin of the Indo-Iranians. BRILL. ISBN 978-9004160545.
- Mallory, J. P.; Adams, Douglas Q. (1997). Encyclopedia of Indo-European Culture. Taylor & Francis. ISBN 9781884964985.
