= Trail Creek Caves =

Group of caves in the U.S. state of Alaska

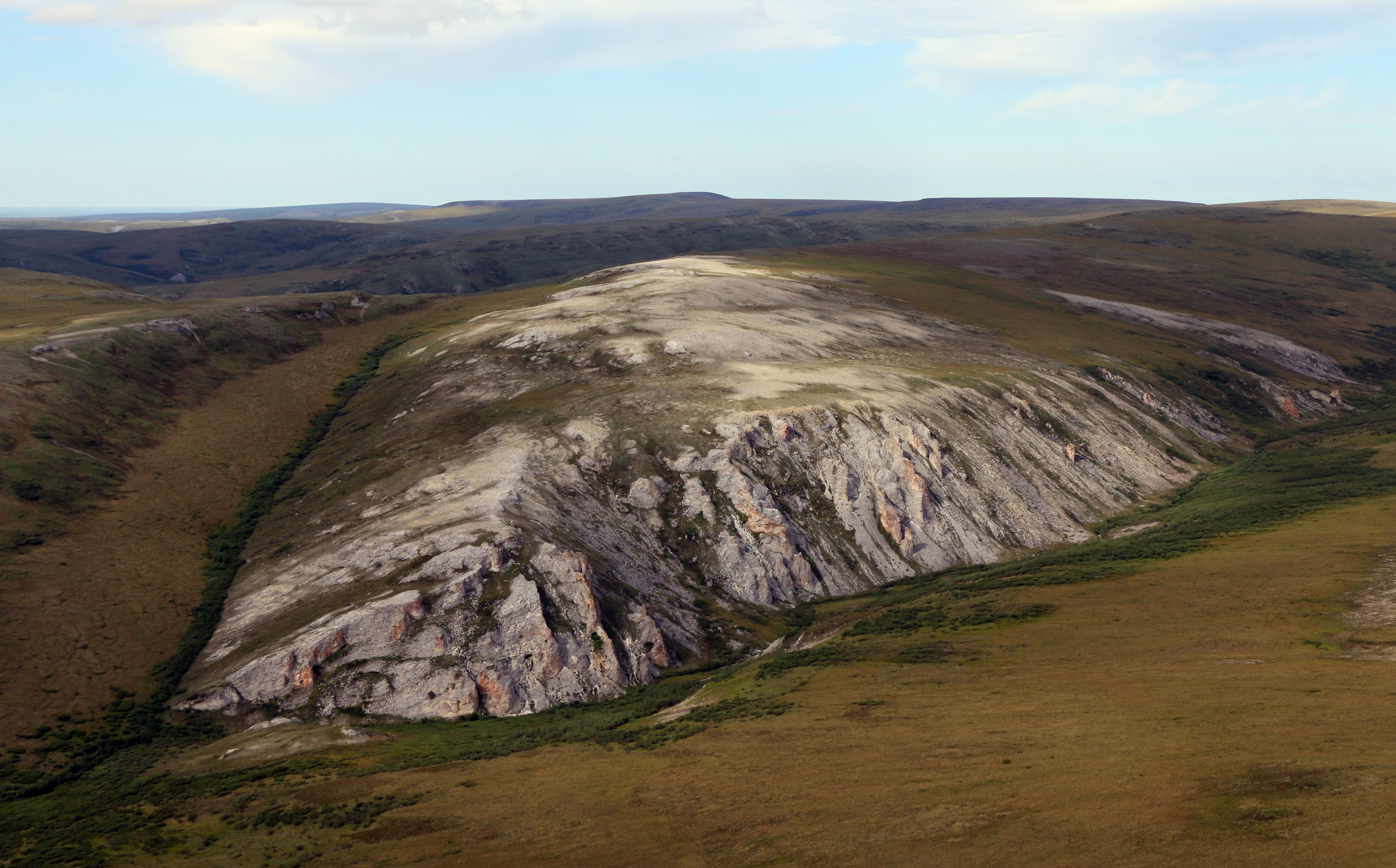
- Aerial view of the Trail Creek Caves Site on Alaska's Seward Peninsula.

- Location within Alaska
- Coordinates: 65°47′28″N 163°24′58″W
- Discovery: 1928
- Geology: limestone
- Entrances: 12

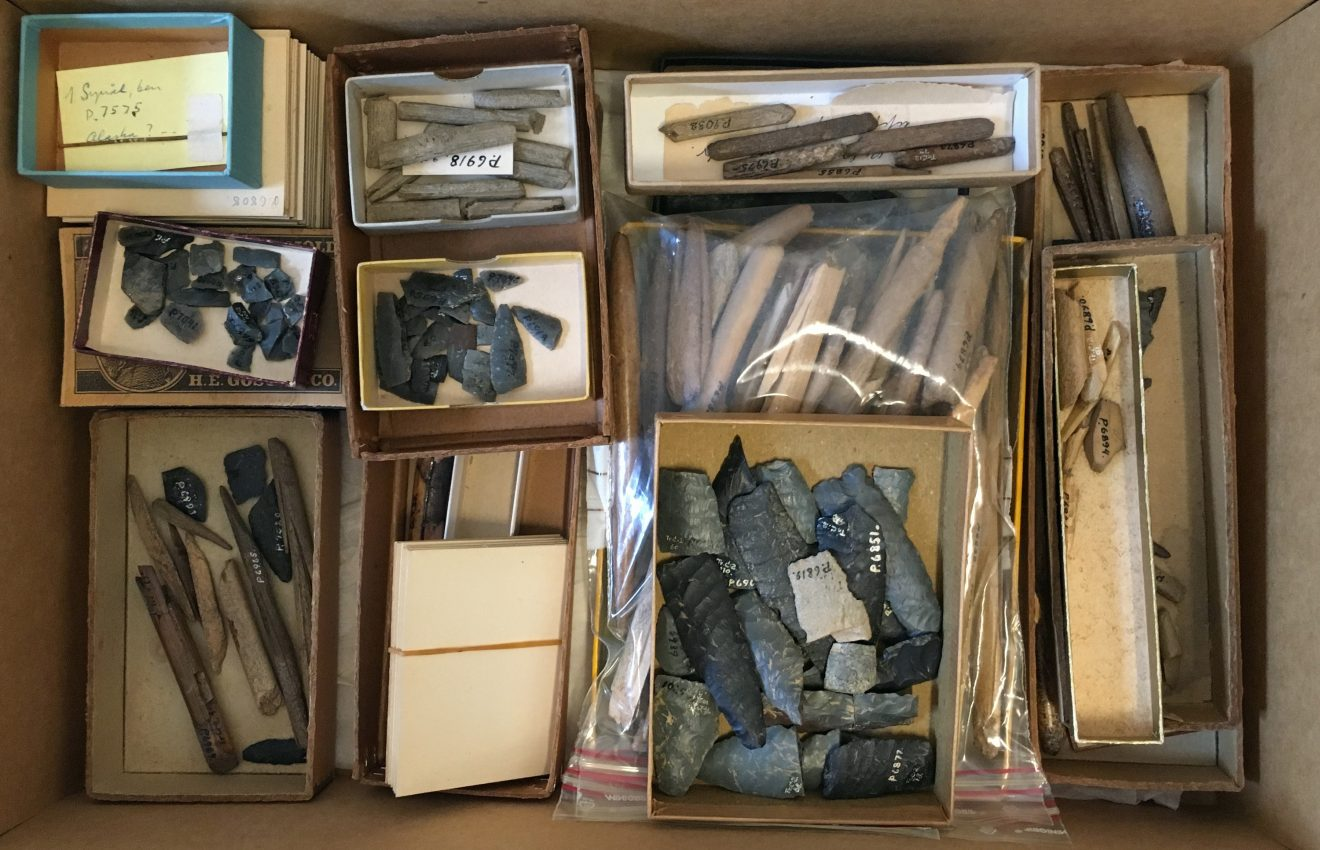
These artifacts from Helge Larsen's 1949-1950 excavations at the Trail Creek Caves Site are housed at the Danish National Museum in Copenhagen, Denmark.

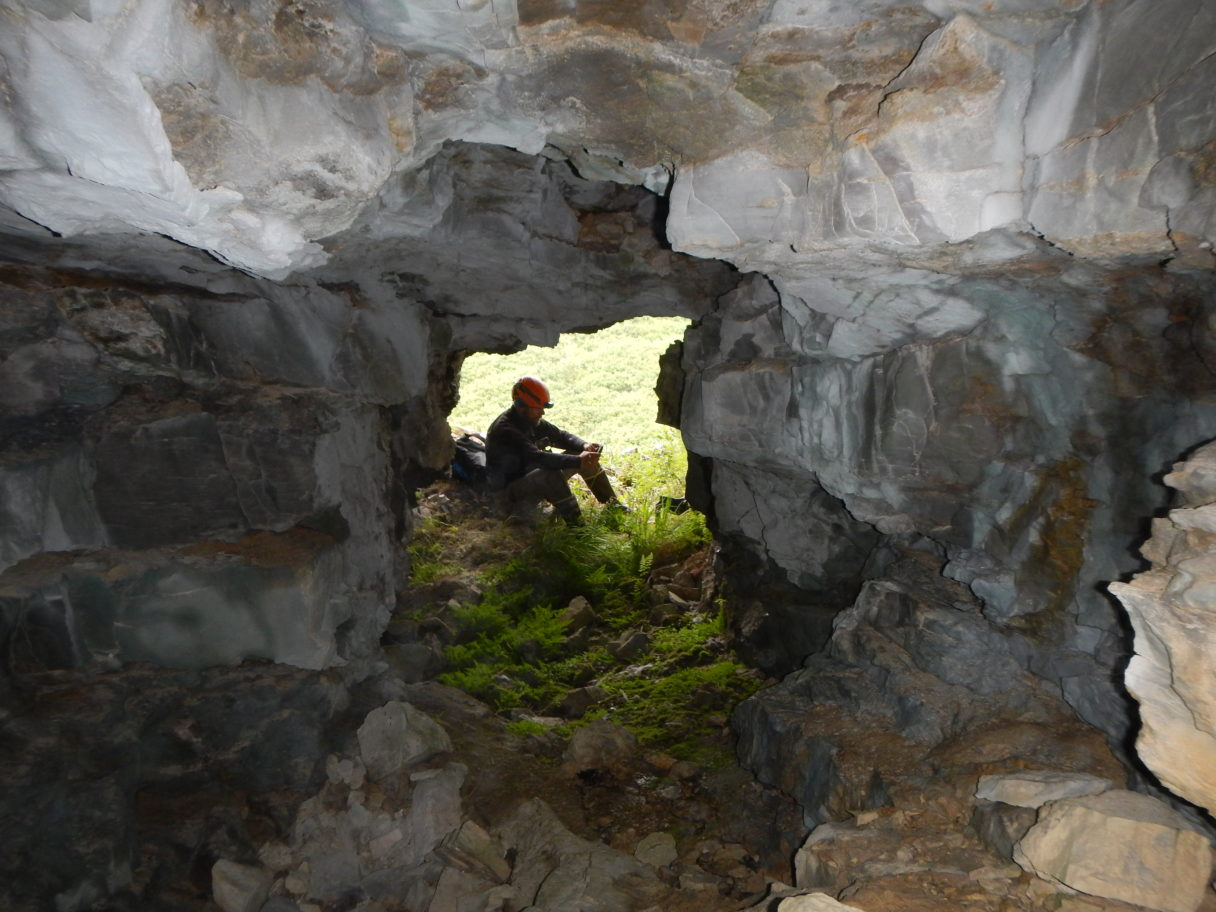
Interior of Trail Creek Cave 2

The Trail Creek Caves are a group of twelve caves found within the Bering Land Bridge National Preserve on the Seward Peninsula of the U.S. state of Alaska. This is a significant archaeological site due to the discovery of several artifacts of ancient hunters. These included stone tools and bone fragments dated to 8,500 years or earlier. The caves were discovered in 1928 by Taylor Moto and Alfred Karmun, locals from Deering, Alaska. Geologist David Hopkins tested the site in 1948. This location was first excavated in from 1949-1950 by Danish archaeologist Helge Larsen. The caves are located along Trail Creek 65°47′28″N 163°24′58″W near its mouth at Cottonwood Creek in the Northwest Arctic Borough.

In 2018, researchers sequenced the genome to around .4 coverage from a tooth excavated from Trail Creek Cave 2 in 1949. The tooth, directly dated to around 9000 BP, belonged to a young child. The young child from Trail Creek Cave 2 was found to cluster genetically with USR1 from the Upward Sun River site in an ancient DNA population grouping referred to as Ancient Beringian. As with USR2 from the Upward Sun River site, the child from Trail Creek Cave 2 was also found to carry a basal lineage of Haplogroup B2; this specific mtDNA lineage is different from the derived B2 lineage generally found in the Americas.
