= Ancient Beringian =

Extinct archaeogenetic lineage

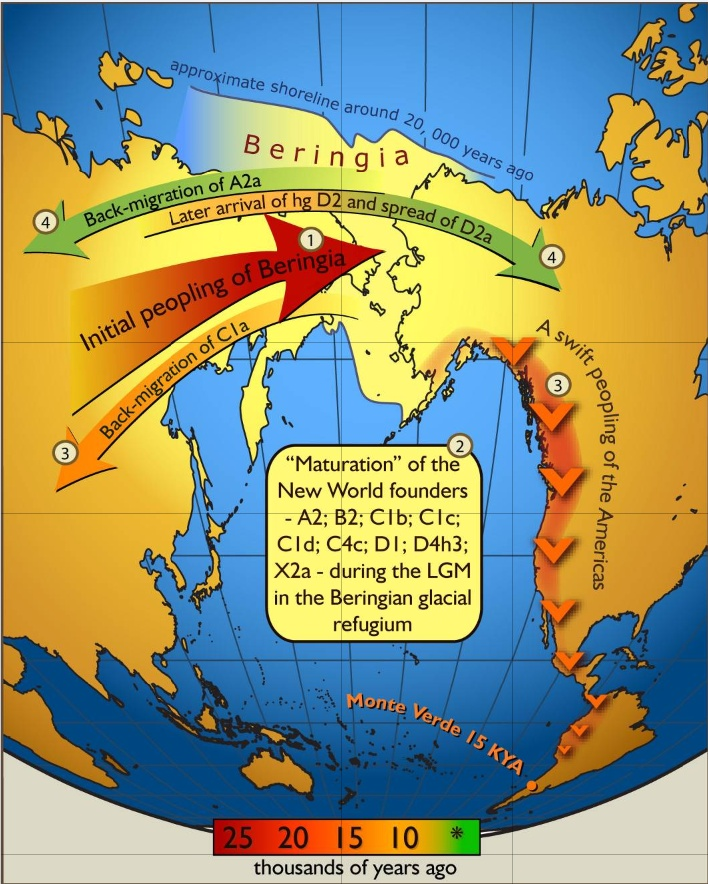
Figure 2. Schematic illustration of maternal (mtDNA) gene-flow in and out of Beringia (long chronology, single source model).

The Ancient Beringian (AB) is a human archaeogenetic lineage, based on the genome of an infant found at the Upward Sun River site (dubbed USR1), dated to 11,500 years ago. The AB lineage diverged from the Ancestral Native American (ANA) lineage about 20,000 years ago. The ANA lineage was estimated as having been formed between 20,000 and 25,000 years ago by a mixture of East Asian (~65%) and Ancient North Eurasian (~35%) lineages, consistent with the model of the peopling of the Americas via Beringia during the Last Glacial Maximum.

== Research ==
The Ancient Beringian lineage is extinct, and is not found as a contribution to modern indigenous lineages in Alaska. The 2018 study suggests that the AB lineage was replaced by or absorbed in a back-migration of "North Native American" (NNA) to Alaska. The modern Athabaskan populations are derived from an admixture of this NNA back-migration and a Paleo-Siberian lineage before about 2,500 years ago.

The discovery was made from archaeogenetic analyses on the remains of two female infants discovered in 2013 at the Upward Sun River site (USR). The USR site is affiliated with the Denali Complex, a dispersed archaeological culture of the American Arctic. The genomic analysis of nuclear DNA of the older of the two infants (USR1) was done at the Centre for Geogenetics at the University of Copenhagen's Natural History Museum of Denmark. Results from the team's genetic analysis were published in January 2018 in the scientific journal Nature. The analysis compared the infant's genomes with both ancient and contemporary genomes. The results suggested that the pre-"Ancestral Native American" lineage derived from the East Asian lineage after 36 kya, with gene flow until about 25 kya. During 25–20 kya, this lineage was later substantially mixed with the Ancient North Eurasian lineage (~35%), who are described as the "result of a palaeolithic admixture" between ancient West Eurasians and ancient East Eurasians, to form the "Ancestral Native American" lineage by 20 kya. The "Ancient Beringian" (AB) lineage derived from ANA and persisted without significant admixture in Alaska until the time of USR1, some 8,000 years later. The lineage of other Paleo-Indians diverged from AB at ca. 20–18 kya, and further divided into "North Native American" (NNA) and "South Native American" lineages between 17.5 kya and 14.6 kya, reflecting the dispersal associated with the early peopling of the Americas.

== See also ==
- Alaska Natives
- Na-Dené languages
- Genetic history of indigenous peoples of the Americas
- Settlement of the Americas
- Upward Sun River site

== Sources ==
- Potter, Ben A.; et al. (25 February 2011). "A Terminal Pleistocene Child Cremation and Residential Structure from Eastern Beringia". Science. 331 (6020): 1058–1062. Bibcode:2011Sci...331.1058P. doi:10.1126/science.1201581. PMID 21350175. S2CID 206531808.
- Potter, Ben A.; Irish, Joel (2 December 2014). "New insights into Eastern Beringian mortuary behavior: A terminal Pleistocene double infant burial at Upward Sun River". PNAS. 111 (48): 17060–17065. Bibcode:2014PNAS..11117060P. doi:10.1073/pnas.1413131111. PMC 4260572. PMID 25385599.
- Price, Michael (3 January 2018), "Ancient Americans arrived in a single wave, Alaskan infant's genome suggests", Science, 359 (6371), American Association for the Advancement of Science: 14, doi:10.1126/science.359.6371.14, PMID 29301990
