= Ancient North Eurasian =

Archaeogenetic name for an ancestral genetic component

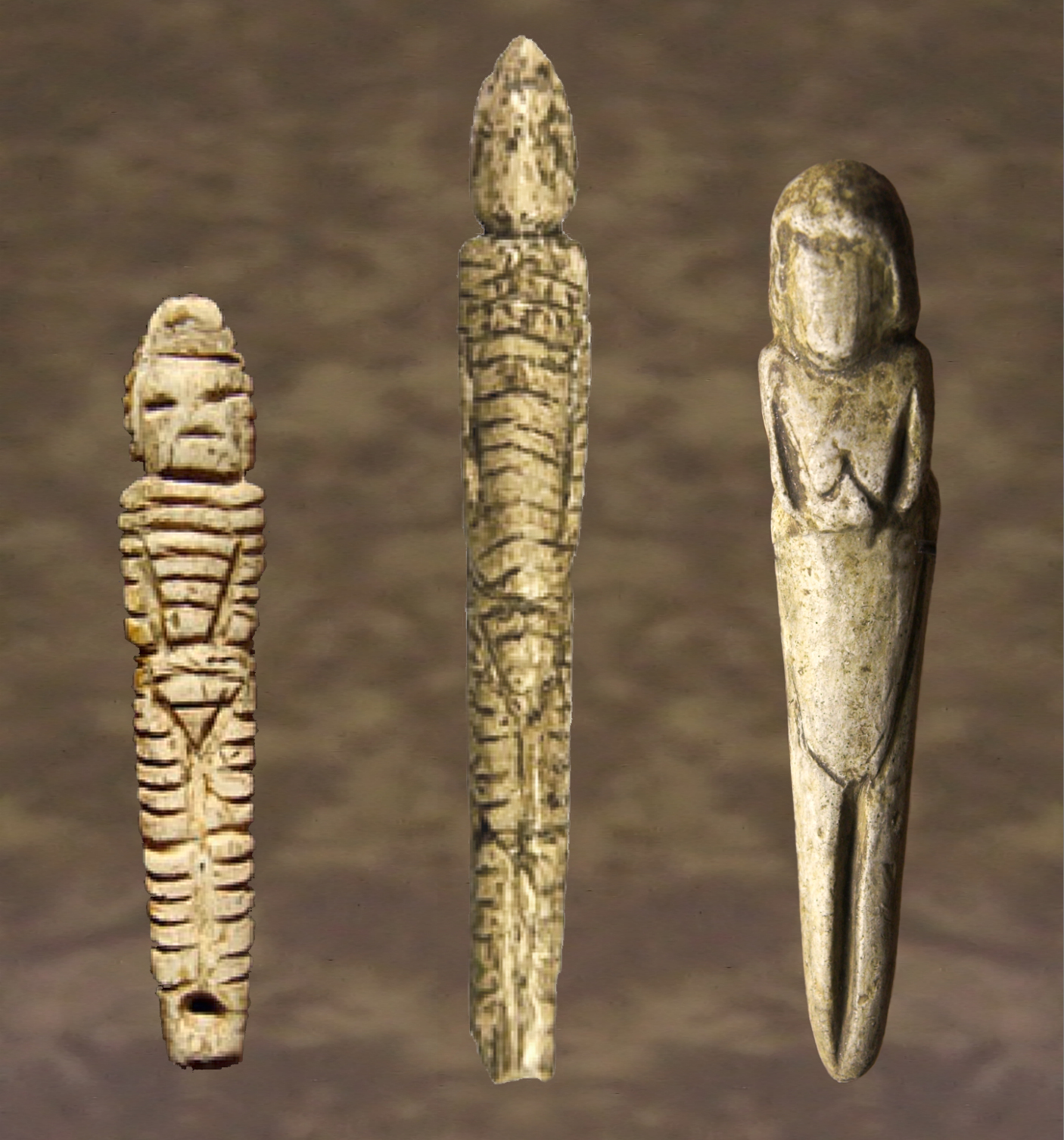
Mal'ta–Buret' culture ivory figurines (c. 24,000 BP-c. 15,000 BP). Some of the figurines wear hooded overalls with decorative stripes.

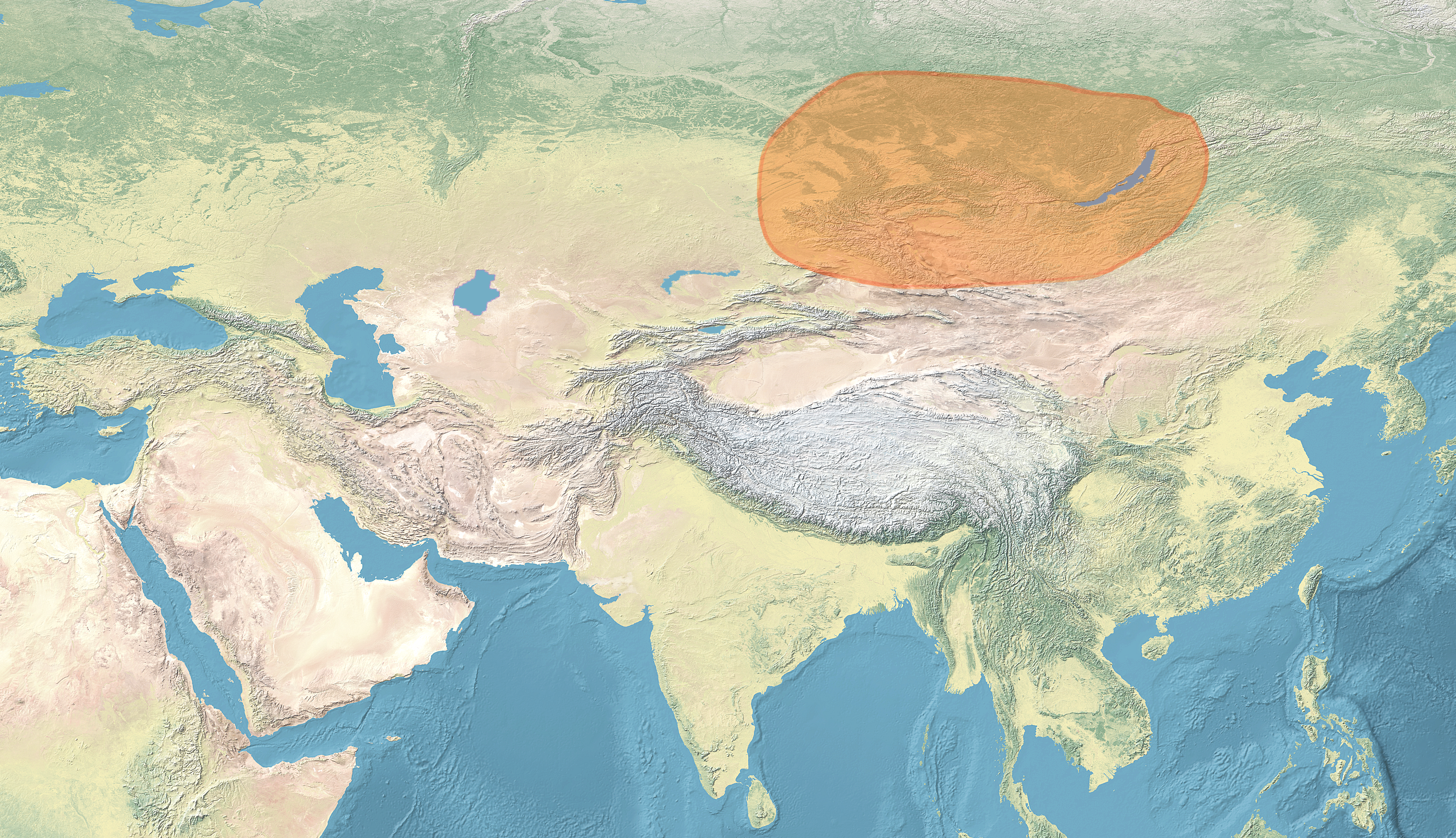
Distribution of Ancient North Eurasians during the Late Pleistocene

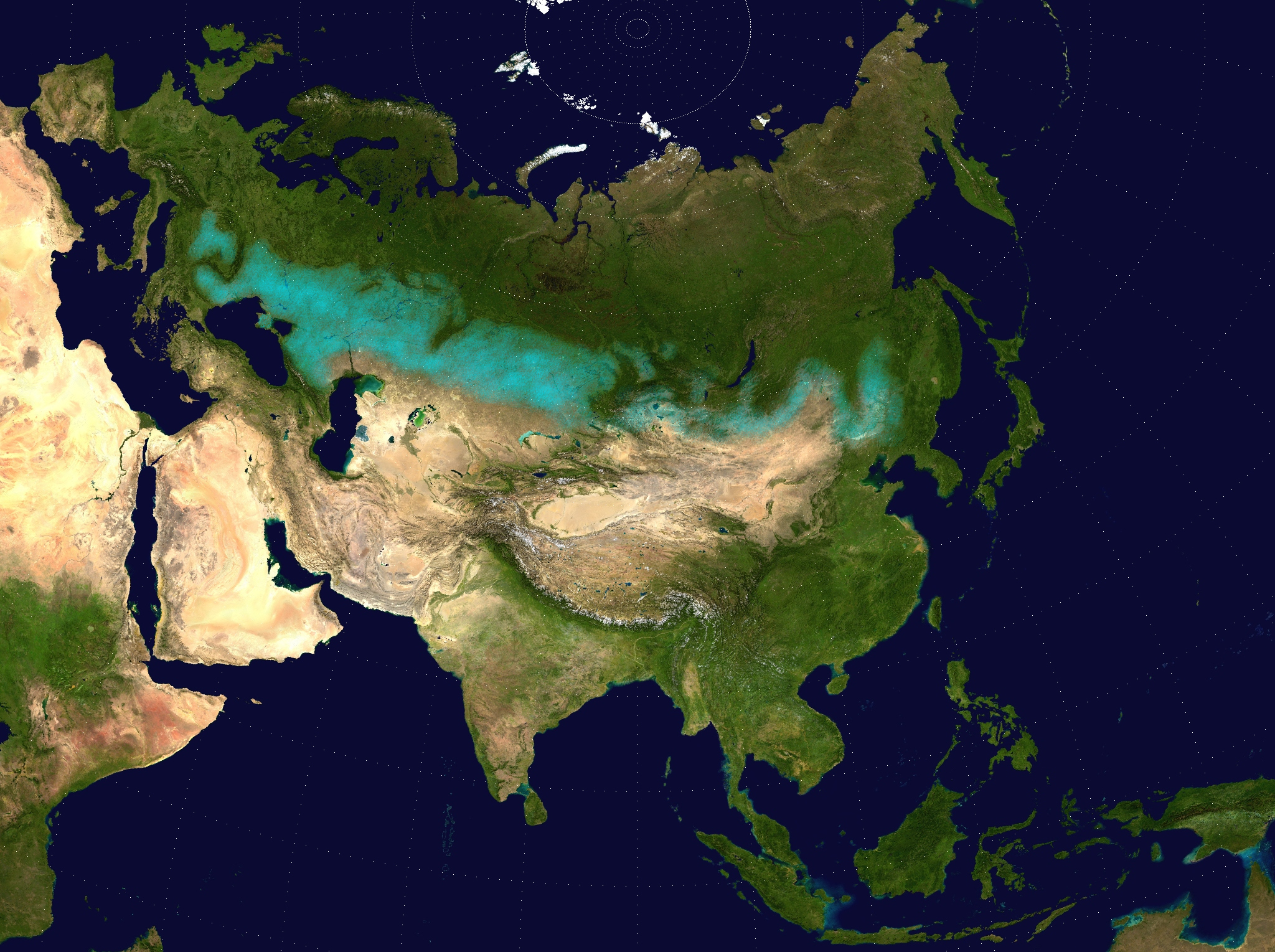
Eurasian Steppe belt (turquoise)

In archaeogenetics, the term Ancient North Eurasian (ANE) refers to an ancestral component that represents the lineage of the people of the Mal'ta–Buret' culture (c. 24,000 BP) and populations closely related to them, such as the Upper Paleolithic individuals from Afontova Gora in Siberia. Genetic studies also revealed that the ANE are closely related to the remains of the preceding Yana culture (c. 32,000 BP), which were dubbed as Ancient North Siberians (ANS), and which either are directly ancestral to the ANE, or both being closely related sister lineages.

The ANE/ANS lineages both derive their ancestry from an admixture event between Ancient West Eurasians (about 65%, best represented by Upper Paleolithic Europeans such as Kostenki-14, c. 38,000 BP) and Ancient East Eurasians (about 35%, best represented by the Tianyuan man, c. 39,000 BP) during the Upper Paleolithic period. The Pleistocene ANE gene pool is likely associated with so-called "Western features", as visible in their descendants, in the Tarim Mummies.

Around 20,000 to 25,000 years ago, a branch of Ancient North Eurasian people mixed with Ancient East Asians, which led to the emergence of Ancestral Native American, Ancient Beringian and Ancient Paleo-Siberian (APS) populations. It is unknown exactly where this population admixture took place, and two opposing theories have put forth different migratory scenarios that united the Ancient North Eurasians with ancient East Asian populations.

Later, ANE populations migrated westward into Europe and admixed with European Western hunter-gatherer (WHG)-related groups to form the Eastern hunter-gatherer (EHG) group, which later admixed with Caucasus hunter-gatherers to form the Western Steppe Herder group, which became widely dispersed across Eurasia during the Bronze Age.

ANE ancestry has spread throughout Eurasia and the Americas in various migrations since the Upper Paleolithic. Significant ANE ancestry can be found in Native Americans, as well as in Europe, South Asia, Central Asia, and Siberia. It has been suggested that their mythology may have featured narratives shared by both Indo-European and some Native American cultures, such as the existence of a metaphysical world tree and a dog which guards the path to the afterlife.

== Genetic studies ==
=== Definition ===
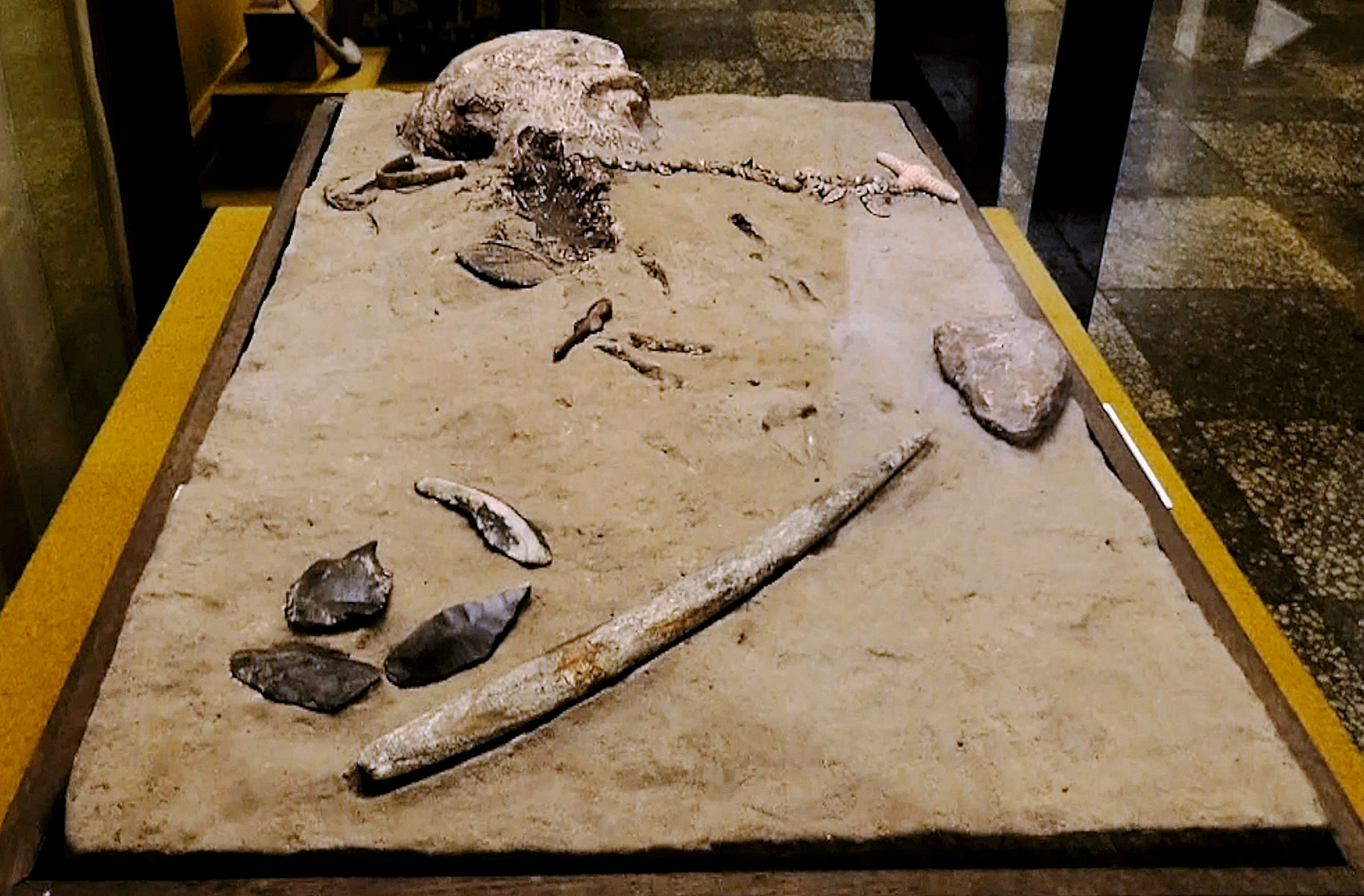
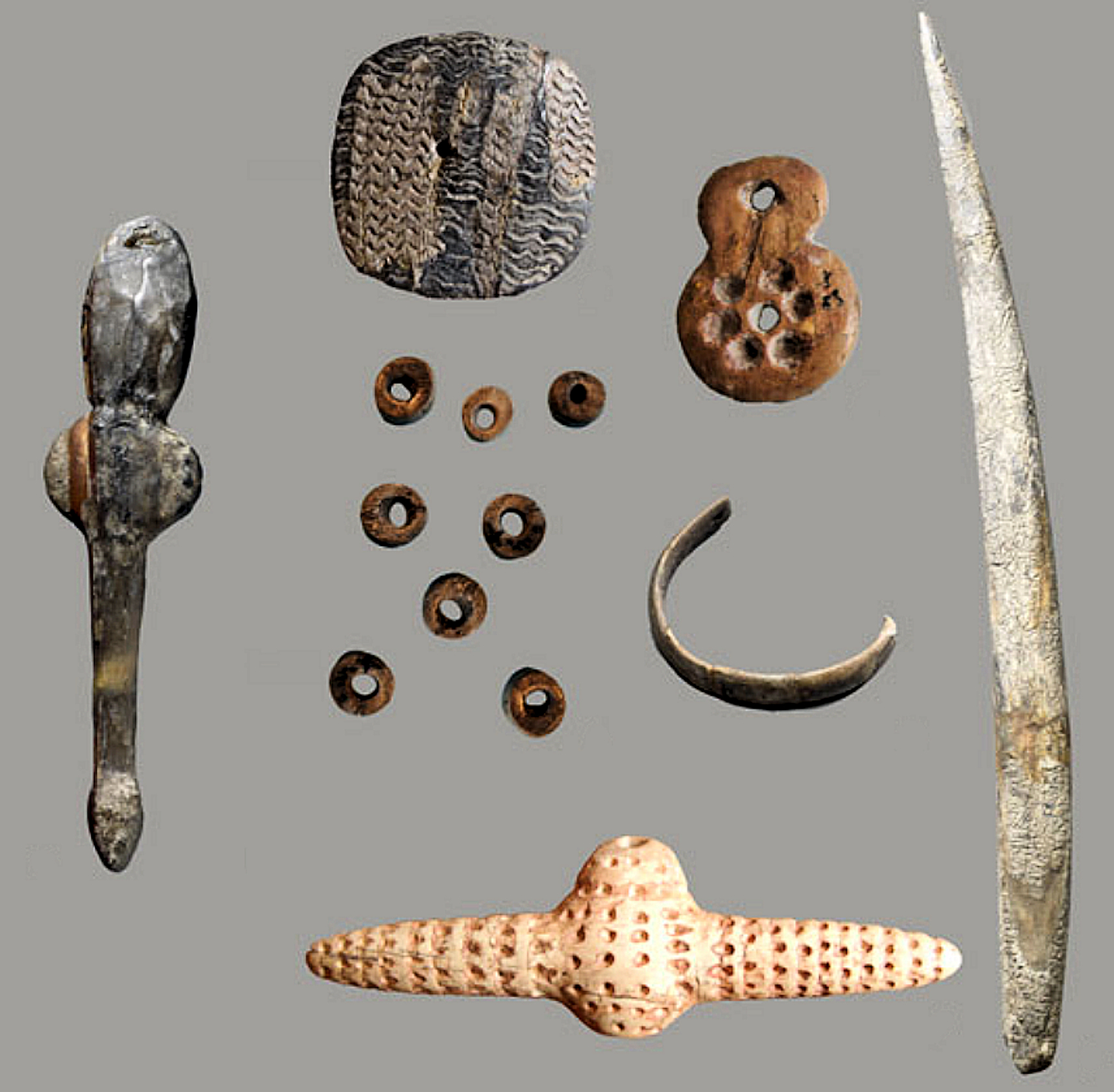
The Mal'ta boy (MA-1), dated 24,000 BP, with tomb artifacts, Hermitage Museum (Hall 11), Saint-Petersburg.

The ANE lineage, also known as Paleolithic Siberians, is defined by association with the "Mal'ta boy" (MA-1), the remains of an individual who lived during the Last Glacial Maximum, 24,000 years ago in central Siberia, discovered in the 1920s. Together with the Yana Rhinoceros Horn Site samples, and Afontova Gora individuals, they are collectively referred to as Ancient North Siberians, although Ancient North Eurasian is also used as a collective name for both MA-1 and Yana remains.

Ancient North Eurasian-associated Y-chromosome haplogroups are P-M45, and its subclades R and Q. Haplogroup P is inferred to have originated around 44,000 years ago in South or Southeast Asia and is observed with its highest frequency among indigenous Southeast Asian groups, such as the Andamanese or the Jahai people. P is downstream to haplogroup K2b found among the Upper Paleolithic Tianyuan man in Northern China, with its sister clade haplogroup MS-P397 being most common among Oceanian populations. Their maternal haplogroup belonged to subclades of haplogroup U commonly found among West Eurasian populations.

=== Formation ===
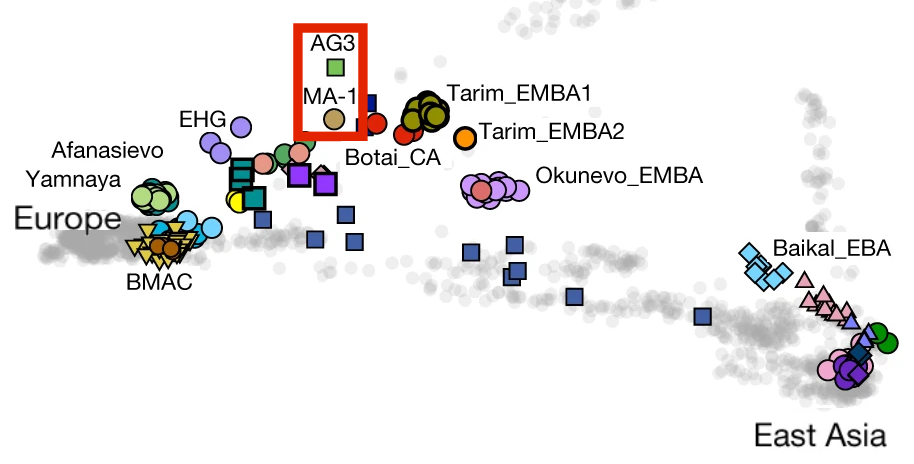
Human principal component analysis (PCA) with ancient human genomes projected on top.

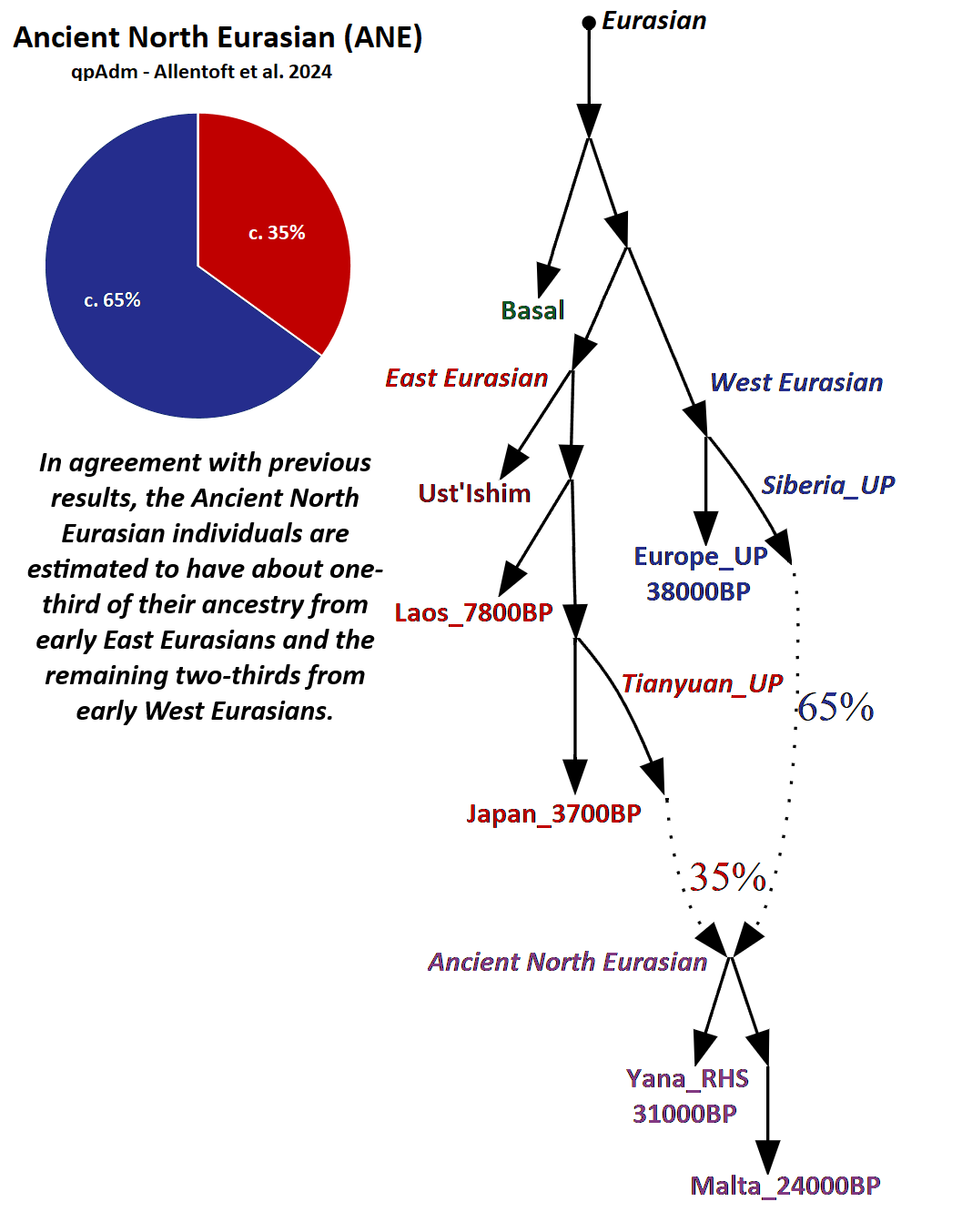
A qpGraph model by Allentoft et al. 2024, showing the possible formation of Ancient North Siberians/Eurasians (ANS/ANE).

The formation of the Ancient North Eurasian/Siberian (ANE/ANS) gene pool occurred during the Upper Paleolithic period: an early West Eurasian population related to Upper Paleolithic Europeans, such as Kostenki-14 and Sungir, migrated via a northern route into Siberia where they encountered and admixed with an Ancient East Eurasian population which arrived earlier during the Initial Upper Paleolithic period via a southern route. The East Eurasian source is most closely related to the ancestry found among the 40,000 year old Tianyuan man of Northern China and other Upper Paleolithic Siberian and East/Southeast Asian groups. In total, the ANE/ANS derive around 50–71% ancestry from an early West Eurasian-affiliated source, and 29–50% from an East Eurasian source. On average, the ANE/ANS are usually modeled as roughly 2/3 early West Eurasian and 1/3 early East Eurasian. (Note: Sikora et al. (2019) model the ANE/ANS individuals as 22–29% East Eurasian and the remainder West Eurasian. Massilani et al. (2020): "In agreement with previous results (10), the Yana individuals are estimated to have about one-third of their ancestry from early East Eurasians and the remaining two-thirds from the early West Eurasians." Yang et al. (2020) modeled the ANS/ANE as c. 32–38% East Eurasian and c. 62–68% West Eurasian. Vallini et al. (2022) model Yana as c. 50% West Eurasian and c. 50% East Eurasian. Vallini et al. (2024) modeled ANS (Yana) as around 47% East Eurasian and 53% West Eurasian, while ANE (Malta) was modeled as roughly 33% East Eurasian and 67% West Eurasian. Allentoft et al. (2024) modeled both ANS/ANE as around 35% East Eurasian and 65% West Eurasian.)

The Ancient North Eurasian lineage (represented by the Mal'ta and Yana specimens) is taking up an intermediate position between Ancient West Eurasians (represented by a Kostenki-14-like lineage) and Ancient East Eurasians (represented by a Tianyuan-like lineage), consisted with them being the result of a Paleolithic admixture event. In terms of genome-wide structure the Ancient North Eurasian lineage appears roughly intermediate between modern western Eurasians and Native Americans, but distant from modern East Asians.

Grebenyuk et al. argues that Ancient North Eurasians were "Early Upper Paleolithic tribes of hunters" and linked to similar groups associated with Southern Siberian sites. These communities of Southern Siberian and Central Asian hunters belonged to one of the earliest migration waves of anatomically modern humans into Siberia. The authors summarized that "the initial peopling of Northeastern Asia by the anatomically modern humans could have happened both from West to East and from South to North".

== Distribution and expansion patterns ==
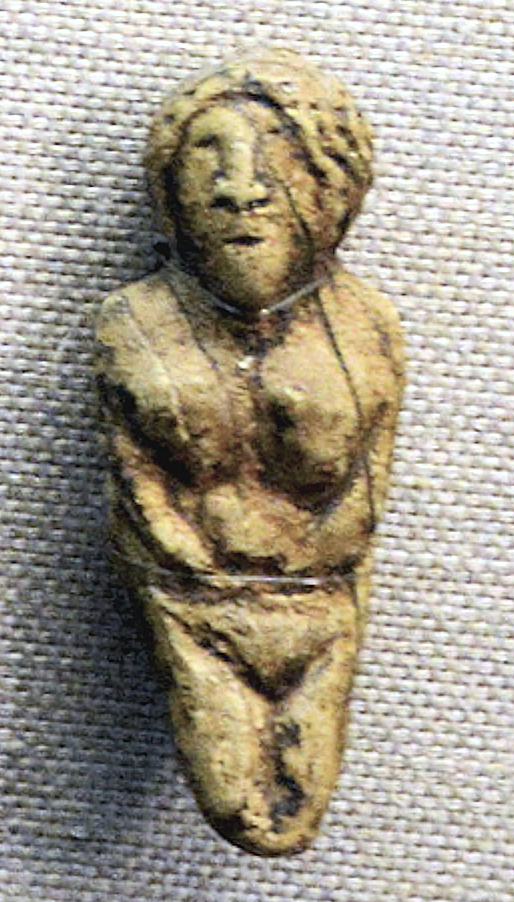
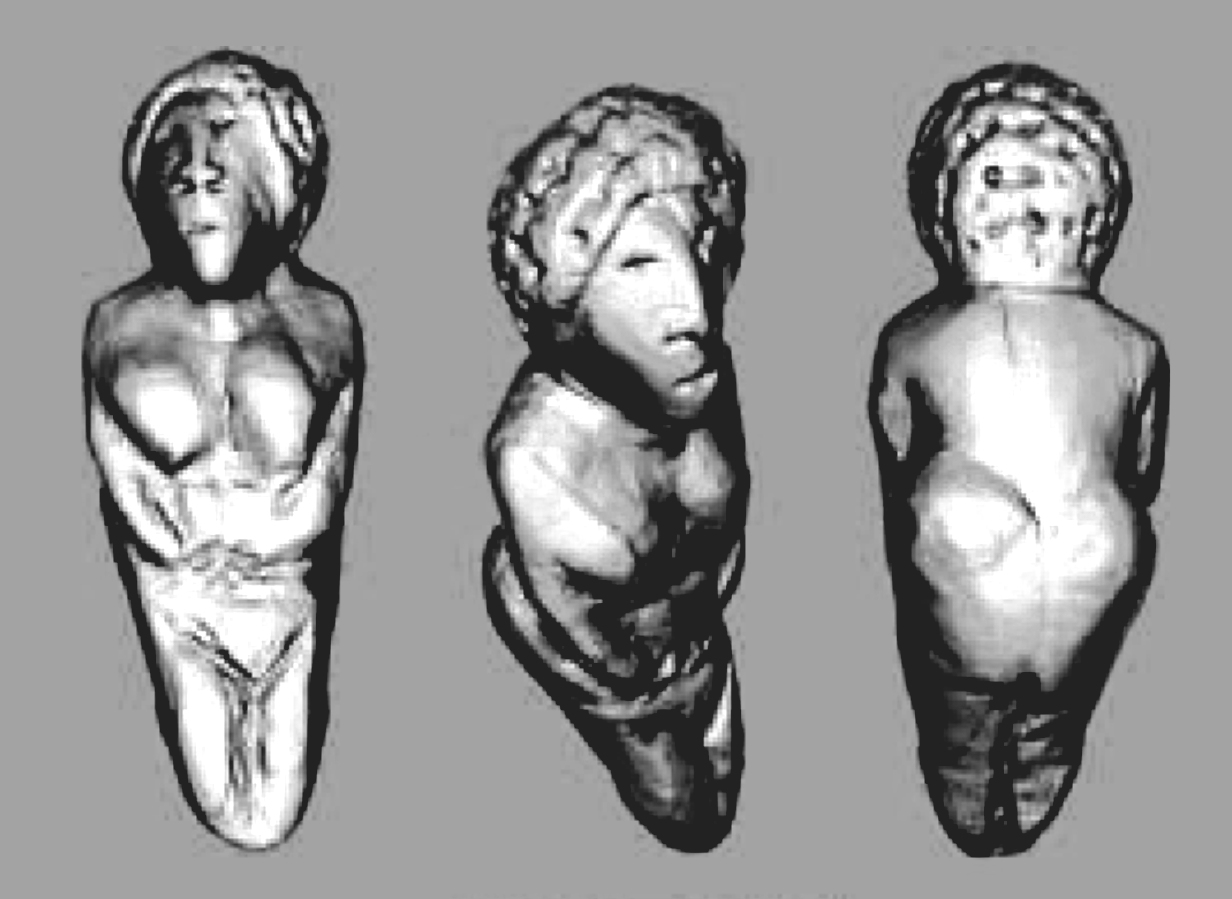
One of the "Mal'ta figurines" with facial features, and 3D rendering. Circa 23,000 BP.

By c. 32kya, populations carrying ANE-related ancestry were probably widely distributed across northeast Eurasia. They may have expanded as far as Alaska and the Yukon, but were forced to abandon high latitude regions following the onset of harsher climatic conditions that came with the Last Glacial Maximum. Gene sequencing of another south-central Siberian people (Afontova Gora-2) dating to approximately 17,000 years ago, revealed similar autosomal genetic signatures to that of Mal'ta boy-1, suggesting that the region was continuously occupied by humans throughout the Last Glacial Maximum.

It is suggested that the ANE ancestry found among modern human populations was largely contributed from a population linked to Afontova Gora (AG2/3), rather than Malta (MA1) or Yana.

ANE-like ancestry was an important genetic contributor to Native Americans, Europeans, Ancient Central Asians, South Asians, and some East Asian groups, in order of significance. Lazaridis et al. (2016:10) note "a cline of ANE ancestry across the east-west extent of Eurasia". A 2016 study found that the global maximum of ANE ancestry occurs in modern-day Kets, Mansi, Native Americans, and Selkups.

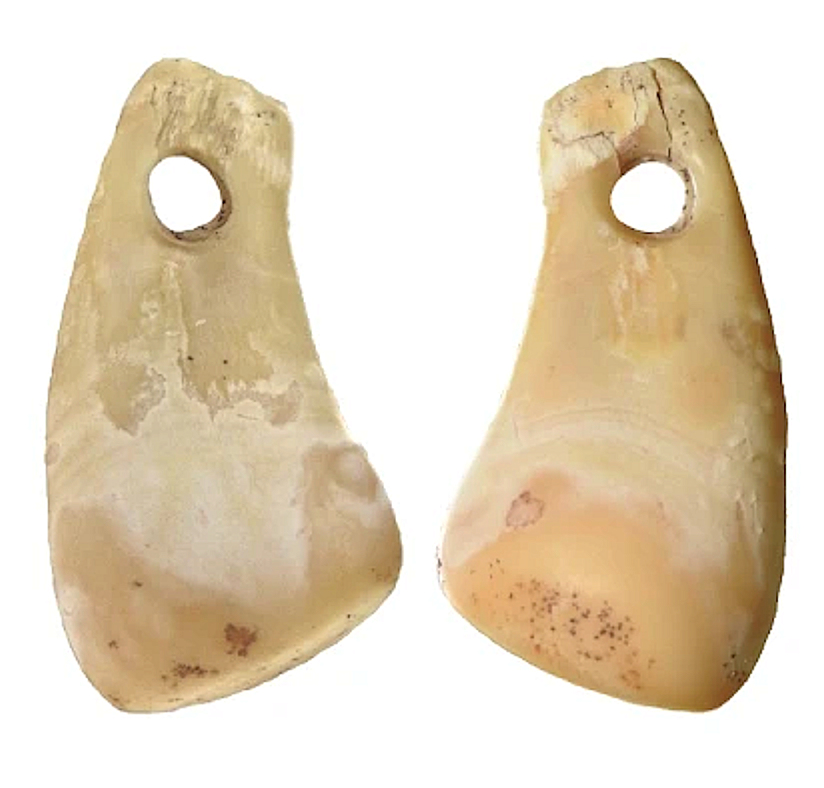
Deer tooth pendant of an ANE woman, from Denisova Cave, dated circa 24,700 years BP.

A deer tooth pendant impregnated with the genetic material of an ANE woman was found in the Denisova Cave, and dated to circa 24,700 years before present. She is closely related to Mal'ta and Afontova Gora specimens, found further east.

The ancient Tianyuan Man, and by extension modern East/Southeast Asian populations, lacked Upper Paleolithic Western Eurasian or ANE-related admixture, suggesting "resistance of those groups to the incoming UP population movements", or alternatively, a subsequent reexpansion from a genetically East Asian-like population reservoir. A different but geographically close specimen, known as the Salkhit individual (c. 34,000 BP) from Northern Mongolia was found to display a complex relation to the Yana individuals. While the Yana individuals derived around 50% of their ancestry from a Tianyuan-like source, the Salkhit individual derived around 25% ancestry from the Yana lineage, with the remainder 75% being from the Tianyuan lineage.

=== Groups partially derived from the Ancient North Eurasians ===
==== Native American contribution ====
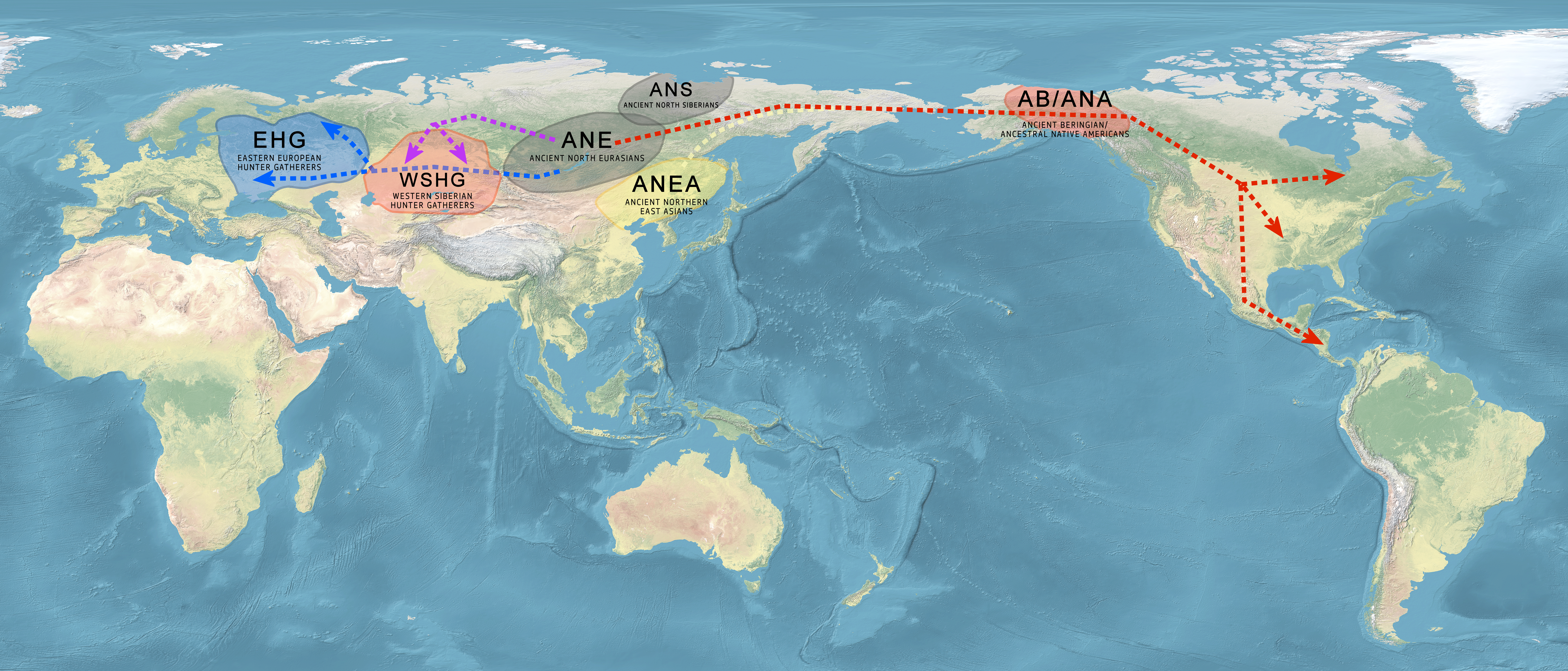
The Ancient North Eurasian (ANE) network consists of several Paleolithic Siberian samples and contributed ancestry towards a wide variety of populations across Eurasia.

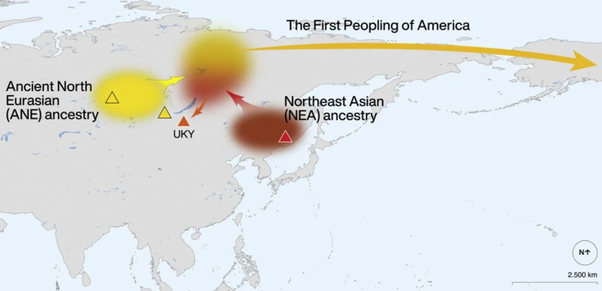
The map shows the origin of the first major wave of Native Americans. Involved are the ANE (Ancestral Northern Eurasian, which are related to Europeans) and the NEA (Northeast Asians, which are an East Asian-related people). The admixture happened somewhere in Northeast Siberia.

According to Moreno-Mayar et al. 2018 between 14% and 38% of Native American ancestry may originate from gene flow from the Mal'ta–Buret' (ANE) population. This difference is caused by the penetration of posterior Neo-Siberian migrations into the Americas, with the lowest percentages of ANE ancestry found in Inuit and Alaskan Natives, as these groups are the result of migrations into the Americas roughly 5,000 years ago. Estimates for ANE ancestry among first wave Native Americans show higher percentages, such as 41% (36-45%) for those belonging to the Andean region in South America. The other ancestry component among Native Americans (the remainder of their ancestry) was of East Asian-like origin, specifically from a lineage that diverged from East Asians c. 30,000 years ago.

According to Jennifer Raff, the Ancient North Eurasian population mixed with a daughter population of ancient East Asians, who they encountered around 25,000 years ago, which led to the emergence of ancestral Native American populations. However, the exact location where the admixture took place is unknown, and the migratory movements that united the two populations are a matter of debate. Vallini et al. 2024 notes that the "position of Native Americans suggests a primarily East Asian ancestry, with a smaller contribution from palaeolithic West Eurasian populations".

One theory supposes that Ancient North Eurasians migrated south to East Asia, or Southern Siberia, where they would have encountered and mixed with ancient East Asians. Genetic evidence from Lake Baikal in Mongolia supports this area as the location where the admixture took place.

However, a third theory, the Beringian standstill hypothesis, suggests that East Asians instead migrated north to Northeastern Siberia, where they mixed with ANE, and later diverged in Beringia, where distinct Native American lineages formed. This theory is supported by maternal and nuclear DNA evidence. According to Grebenyuk, after 20,000 BP, a branch of Ancient East Asians migrated to Northeastern Siberia, and mixed with descendants of the ANE, leading to the emergence of APS and Native American populations in Extreme Northeastern Asia. However, the Beringian standstill hypothesis is not supported by paternal DNA evidence, which may reflect different population histories for paternal and maternal lineages in Native Americans, which is not uncommon and has been observed in other populations.

The descendants of admixture between ANE and ancient East Asians include Ancient Beringian/Ancestral Native American, which are specific archaeogenetic lineages, based on the genome of an infant found at the Upward Sun River site (dubbed USR1), dated to 11,500 years ago. The AB and the Ancestral Native American (ANA) lineage formed about 25,000 years ago, and subsequently diverged from each other, with the AB staying in the Beringian region, while the Ancestral Native Americans populated the Americas. The ANE genetic contribution to late-Paeolithic Ancestral Native Americans (USR1 specimen, dated to 11,500 BP in Alaska, and Clovis specimen, dated to 12,600 BP in Montana) is estimated at 36.8%. There are also the APS, populations represented by the Late Upper Paeolithic Lake Baikal Ust'Kyakhta-3 (UKY) 14,050-13,770 BP. They carried 30% ANE ancestry and 70% East Asian ancestry. Despite extensive admixture with East Asian-related groups, APS ancestry persists in Siberian groups such as Yeniseian and Uralic-speaking groups.

==== Jōmon people ====
The Jōmon people, the pre-Neolithic population of Japan, primarily descend from an ancient East Asian lineage but have marginally relevant affinities with the Yana Rhinoceros Horn Site specimen, associated with Ancient North Eurasians (or Ancient North Siberians). This indicates gene flow between Ancient North Siberians and the ancestral Jōmon lineage prior to the Jōmon's isolation from other East Eurasians. This gene flow is also associated with the introduction of microblade technology to northern Japan. According to Bennett et al. (2024), the Basal Asian-like ancestors of the Jōmon interacted with groups that entered Siberia through a northern migration route, thus explaining the Jōmon's affinities with Ancient North Siberians. Other studies, however, suggest no evidence for direct ANE-related gene flow into the Jōmon, indicating non-demic diffusion. However, the possibility of small non-East Eurasian input is not ruled out. Other studies found no evidence for ANE-related gene flow. According to Yang et al. (2025), whilst the Jōmon have the lowest Denisovan ancestry among East Asians like West Eurasians, it is not attributed to either West Eurasian or Hoabinhian admixture, which are not found in the Jōmon. However, the Jōmon most likely inherited their Denisovan ancestry from the same ancestral populations that ANE-related and Tianyuan-related populations inherited their Denisovan ancestry from. Other studies suggest that Yana-related admixture is mostly found in Hokkaido Jōmon but clarify that "absolute differences in Yana-related drift among Jōmon and other EASs are modest". They might also reflect admixture with northern populations.

==== Siberian and Asian Holocene populations ====
Altai hunter-gatherer (Altai_HG) is the name given to Middle Holocene Siberian hunter-gatherers within the Altai-Sayan region in Southern Siberia. They were a mixture of APS-related ancestries (53.7–66.3%) and ANE-related ancestries (33.7–46.3%) and show increased affinity towards Native Americans due to the role of the former. Bronze Age groups from North and Inner Asia with significant ANE ancestry (e.g. Lake Baikal hunter-gatherers, Okunevo pastoralists) can be successfully modeled with Altai hunter-gatherers as a proximal ANE-derived ancestry source.

West Siberian Hunter-Gatherer (WSHG) is a specific archaeogenetic lineage that was first reported by Narasimhan et al. (2019). It can be modeled as 20% EHG, 73% ANE and 6% Ancient Northeast Asian. Although only represented by three sampled hunter-gatherer individuals from Tyumen Oblast in the Russian Forest Zone east of the Urals dated ca. 5,000 BCE, high-levels of WSHG-like ancestry can be detected in various populations of Central Asia until the Bronze Age. The population of the Botai culture, while probably not directly descended from WSHG, displays a high affinity with the WSHG lineage. The European-Siberian cline defined by Eastern hunter-gatherer-like ancestry stretched from Central Europe to Western Siberia and was already established 10,000 years ago.

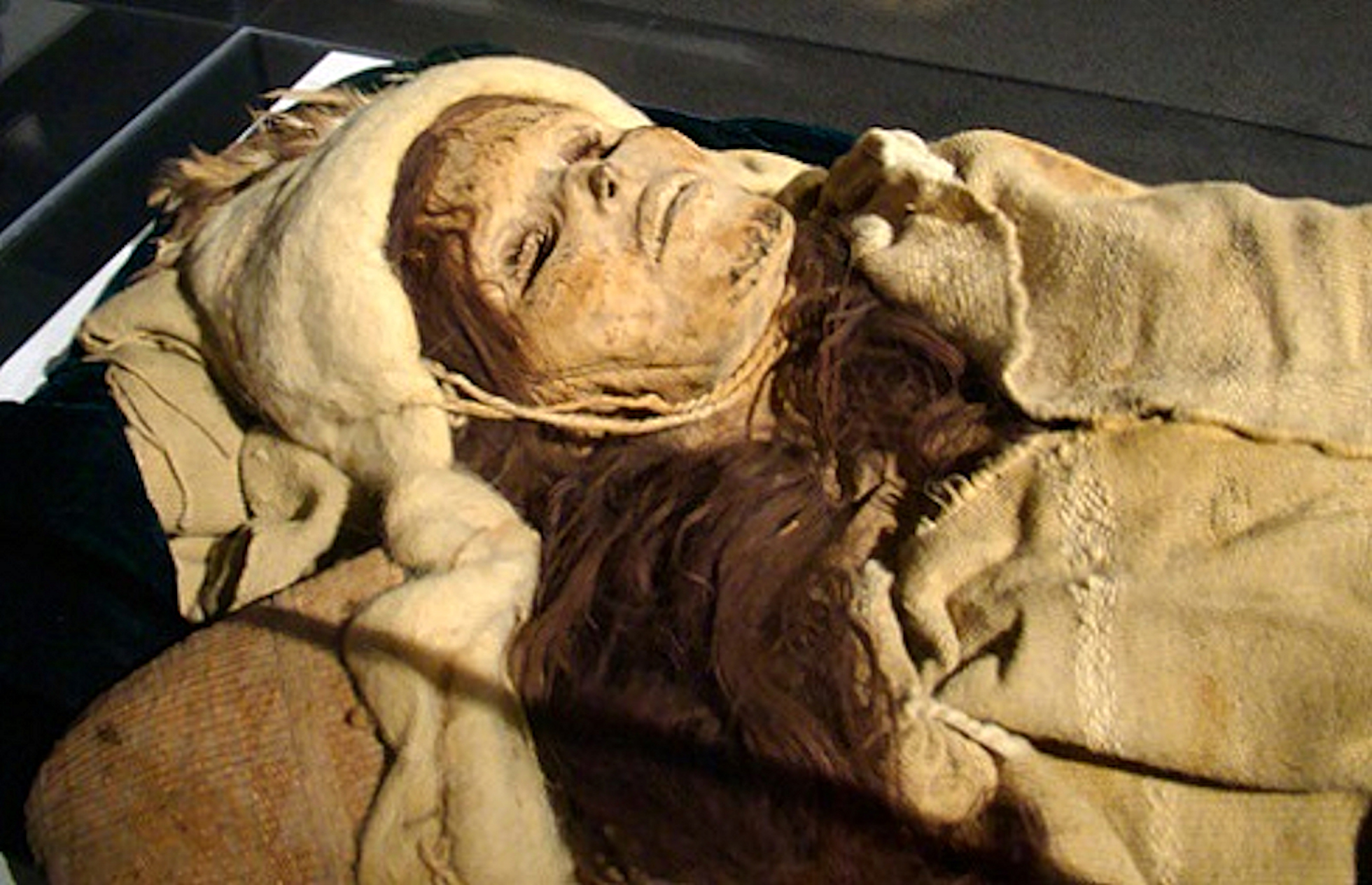
"Princess of Xiaohe", one of the Tarim mummies, the "best representatives" of Ancient North Eurasians.

Among later Siberian populations, the Neolithic to Early Bronze Age period, Baikal Eneolithic (Baikal_EN) and Baikal Early Bronze Age (Baikal_EBA) derived 6.4% to 20.1% ancestry from ANE, while the rest of their ancestry was derived from Ancient Northeast Asian (ANA) sources. Fofonovo_EN near Lake Baikal were mixture of 12-17% ANE ancestry and 83-87% ANA ancestry. When Altai_HG is used as a proxy, ANE-related input is present at 20% and 25% for Baikal_EN and Baikal_EBA respectively. The latter figure is produced when Baikal_EBA is modeled as a mixture of Altai_HG and Baikal_EN ancestries.

Present Siberian ancestry found across Eurasia and North America can also be traced to a single gene pool from Middle Holocene Siberians that is best represented by Middle Neolithic Yakutia populations. These populations can be modeled as a mixture of Dzhylinda-1 (71%), which is a mixture of Ancient North Eurasian, Ancient Northern East Asian and Native American, and Early Neolithic West Baikal ancestries (29%), which is Ancient Northern East Asian-rich.

==== Tarim mummies ====
A genomic study published in 2021 found that the early Bronze Age Tarim mummies (dating from 2,135 to 1,623 BCE) were primarily descended from a population represented by the Afontova Gora 3 specimen (AG3), genetically displaying "high affinity" with it. The genetic profile of the Afontova Gora 3 individual represented about 72% of the ancestry of the Tarim mummies, while the remaining 28% of their ancestry was derived from a population represented by the Baikal EBA (Early Bronze Age Northeast Asian Baikal populations).

The Tarim mummies are thus one of the rare Holocene populations who derive most of their ancestry from the Ancient North Eurasians (ANE, specifically the Mal'ta and Afontova Gora populations), despite their distance in time (around 14,000 years). Having survived in a type of genetic bottleneck in the Tarim basin where they preserved and perpetuated their ANE ancestry, the Tarim mummies, more than any other ancient populations, can be considered "the best representatives" of the Ancient North Eurasians among all sampled known Bronze Age populations. The so-called "Western features" of the Tarim Mummies are probably due to their Ancient North Eurasian ancestry.

==== West Asian populations ====
Mesolithic and Neolithic Iranian populations derived a significant amount of their ancestry from an ANE-like geneflow. ANE ancestry is present among Neolithic Iranians as well as the distantly related Caucasus hunter-gatherers, with the remainder ancestry being largely derived from local or nearby West Eurasian and Basal Eurasian sources.

An early Neolithic specimen (Tutkaul1) from Tajikistan was found to be primarily derived from Ancient North Eurasians with some additional Neolithic Iranian-related inputs. The sample is closely related to Afontova Gora 3 (AG3) and Mal'ta 1, as well as to the West Siberian hunter-gatherers (Tyumen and Sosnoviy). While the sample also displays affinity for Eastern hunter-gatherers (EHGs), AG3 was found to be closer to EHGs than Tutkaul1, who instead may be a good proxy for ANE-related ancestry among ancient populations from the Iran and the Turan region.

==== European populations ====
Genomic studies also indicate that the ANE component was brought to Western Europe by people related to the Yamnaya culture, long after the Paleolithic. Lazaridis et al. (2014) detected ANE ancestry among modern European populations in proportions up to 20%. In ancient European populations, the ANE genetic component is visible in tests of the Yamnaya people but not of Western or Central Europeans predating the Corded Ware culture: ANE ancestry was introduced in the European gene pool with the Eastern hunter-gatherer (EHG) lineage which derived significant ancestry from the ANE, c. 70%, with the remaining ancestry from a group more closely related to, but distinct from, Western hunter-gatherers (WHGs). It is represented by multiple individuals, such as from Yuzhny Oleny in Karelia, one of Y-haplogroup R1a-M417, dated c. 8.4 kya, the other of Y-haplogroup J, dated c. 7.2 kya; and one individual from Samara, of Y-haplogroup R1b-P297, dated c. 7.6 kya, as well as individuals from Sidelkino and Popovo. After the end of the Last Glacial Maximum, the EHG and WHG lineages merged in Eastern Europe, accounting for early presence of ANE-derived ancestry in Mesolithic Europe. Evidence suggests that as Ancient North Eurasians migrated westward from Eastern Siberia, they absorbed Western Hunter-Gatherers and other West Eurasian populations as well.

Villalba-Mouco et al. 2023 confirmed the strong affinity between the Eastern European hunter-gatherers (EHG) to the Ancient North Eurasians, and also found a low affinity to the Tianyuan man, explained by them having received significant amounts of ANE ancestry.

Scandinavian hunter-gatherer (SHG) is represented by several individuals buried at Motala, Sweden ca. 6000 BC. They were descended from Western hunter-gatherers who initially settled Scandinavia from the south, and received later admixture from EHG who entered Scandinavia from the north through the coast of Norway.

Western Hunter-Gatherers of the Villabruna cluster also carried the Y-haplogroup R1b, derived from the Ancient North Eurasian haplogroup R*, indicating "an early link between Europe and the western edge of the Steppe Belt of Eurasia." In terms of genome-wide structure the Ancient Western Hunter-Gatherers appear roughly intermediate between EHG and Upper Paleolithic Bichon from Switzerland.

Western Steppe Herders (WSH) is the name given to a distinct ancestral component that represents descent closely related to the Yamnaya culture of the Pontic–Caspian steppe. (Note: "Recent paleogenomic studies have shown that migrations of Western steppe herders (WSH) beginning in the Eneolithic (ca. 3300–2700 BCE) profoundly transformed the genes and cultures of Europe and central Asia... The migration of these Western steppe herders (WSH), with the Yamnaya horizon (ca. 3300–2700 BCE) as their earliest representative, contributed not only to the European Corded Ware culture (ca. 2500–2200 BCE) but also to steppe cultures located between the Caspian Sea and the Altai-Sayan mountain region, such as the Afanasievo (ca. 3300–2500 BCE) and later Sintashta (2100–1800 BCE) and Andronovo (1800–1300 BCE) cultures.") This ancestry is often referred to as Yamnaya ancestry or Steppe ancestry, and was formed from EHG and CHG (Caucasus hunter-gatherer) in about equal proportions. The ancient Bronze-age-steppe Yamnaya and Afanasevo cultures were found to have a significant ANE-like component at c. 25–50% via their EHG and CHG ancestry.

==== East Asian populations ====
ANE ancestry in ancient Northern Chinese populations is mediated through APS-related sources. Early Neolithic Sitaimengguying (STM_EN) populations from the north of the Yan Mountains can be modeled as a mixture of AR14K-related and Early Neolithic West Baikal-related ancestry, which has affinities with APS, with 59.3% ± 5.3% contribution from the latter. Yumin and Middle Neolithic Haminmangha (HMMH_MN) individuals can likewise be modeled as a mixture of Early Neolithic Shandongers and West Baikal-related populations. STM_EN-related populations later contributed to several Yellow River populations, including Middle Neolithic Miaozigou populations from the Nei Mongol region, Late Neolithic Shimao populations from the Shaanxi region and Qijia Culture-related populations from the Upper Yellow River region. They also contributed to West Liao River populations starting from the Hongshan period. Other studies found that Sitaimengguying and Yumin populations can be modeled as a mixture of local Donghulin-related (70–80%) and Baikal-Mongolia-related ancestries (20–30%), with the latter having APS affinities.

Ancient individuals from the Northern Mongolian Plateau likewise have high affinities with APS populations, with the oldest analyzed individual being modeled as a mixture of Early Holocene Southeastern Mongolian Plateau ancestry (29.9%), who have more Yumin affinities, Amur River ancestry (47.6%) and APS ancestry (22.5%). About 5,700 years ago, populations from the Southeastern Mongolian Plateau mixed with their northern neighbors. Populations from Northern China also received input from Northern Mongolian Plateau-related populations. For example, HMMH_MN can be modeled as a mixture of Early Holocene Southeastern Mongolian Plateau ancestry (65.8%) and Northern Mongolian Plateau-like ancestry (34.2%). Early Neolithic Amur populations from ~7,400 years ago can also be modeled as a mixture of Amur River ancestry (28.7%) and Northern Mongolian Plateau-related (71.3%) ancestry, with this admixture occurring about ∼11,500 years ago.

According to a 2019 genetic study, the affinities modern East Asians have with ANE correlate with their affinities to Nganasans.

== Phenotype prediction ==
Genomic studies by Raghavan et al. (2014) and Fu et al. (2016) suggested that Mal'ta boy may have had brown eyes, and relatively dark hair and dark skin, while cautioning that this analysis was based on an extremely low coverage of DNA that might not give an accurate prediction of pigmentation. Mathieson, et al. (2018) could not determine if Mal'ta 1 boy had the derived allele associated with blond hair in ANE descendants, as they could obtain no coverage for this SNP.

=== Anthropologic research ===
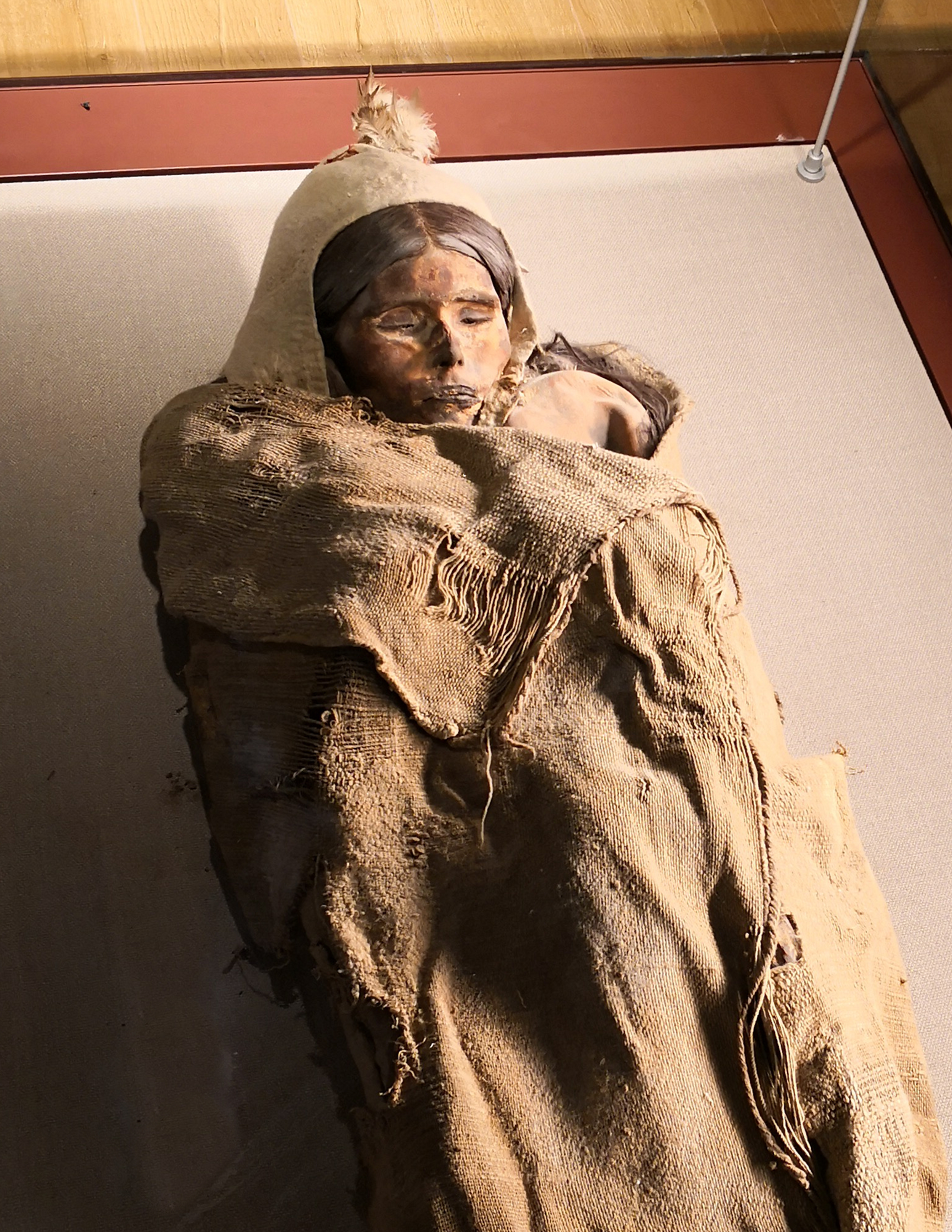
One of the Tarim mummies, a "Beauty of Loulan" dated c. 2000 BCE

Kozintsev (2020, 2022) argues that the historical Southern Siberian Okunevo population, and other Paleo-Siberians, which derive high amounts of their ancestry from Ancient North Eurasians, as possessing a distinct craniometric phenotype, which he dubbed "Americanoid", which represents the variation of the first humans in Siberia and should not be associated solely with ancient Caucasoids. The Ancient North Eurasians themselves represent a "Boreal" variation of early humans. Craniometric data on ANE-rich remains (such as from Botai), show them to cluster most closely with remains from the Pit-Comb Ware culture in Eastern Europe, and to take up a more "Western" position.

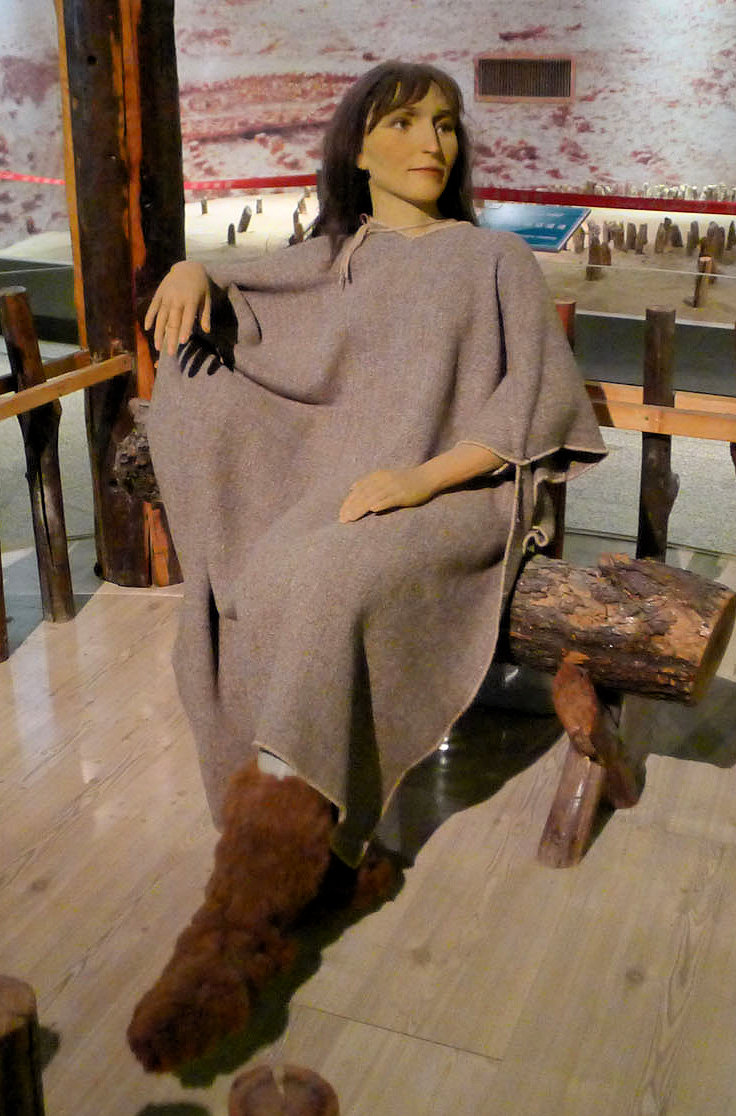
Reconstruction of a female individual from Xiaohe Cemetery. Xinjiang Museum. The Tarim mummies are considered as the "best representatives" of Ancient North Eurasians.

Zhang et al. (2021) proposed that the "Western" like features of the earlier Tarim mummies could be attributed to their Ancient North Eurasian ancestry. Previous craniometric analyses on the early Tarim mummies found that they formed their own cluster, and clustered with neither European-related Steppe pastoralists of the Andronovo and Afanasievo cultures, nor with inhabitants of the Western Asian BMAC culture, nor with East Asian populations further east, but displayed an affinity for two specimens from the Harappan site of the Indus Valley Civilisation.

=== Evolution of blond hair ===
Blond hair is associated with a single nucleotide polymorphism, the mutated allele rs12821256 of the KITLG gene. The earliest known individual with this allele is a female south-central Siberian ANE individual from the Afontova Gora 3 site, which is dated to c. 17,000 before present (the earlier ANE Mal'ta boy lacks the sequence coverage to make this determination). The allele then appears later in ANE-derived Eastern Hunter-Gatherer (EHG) populations at Samara, Motala and Ukraine, circa 10,000 BP, and then in populations with Steppe ancestry. Mathieson, et al. (2018) thus argued that this allele originated in the Ancient North Eurasian population, before spreading to western Eurasia.

Geneticist David Reich said that the KITLG gene for blond hair probably entered continental Europe in a population migration wave from the Eurasian steppe, by a population carrying substantial Ancient North Eurasian ancestry. The gene was also found among the Tarim mummies.

== Comparative mythology ==
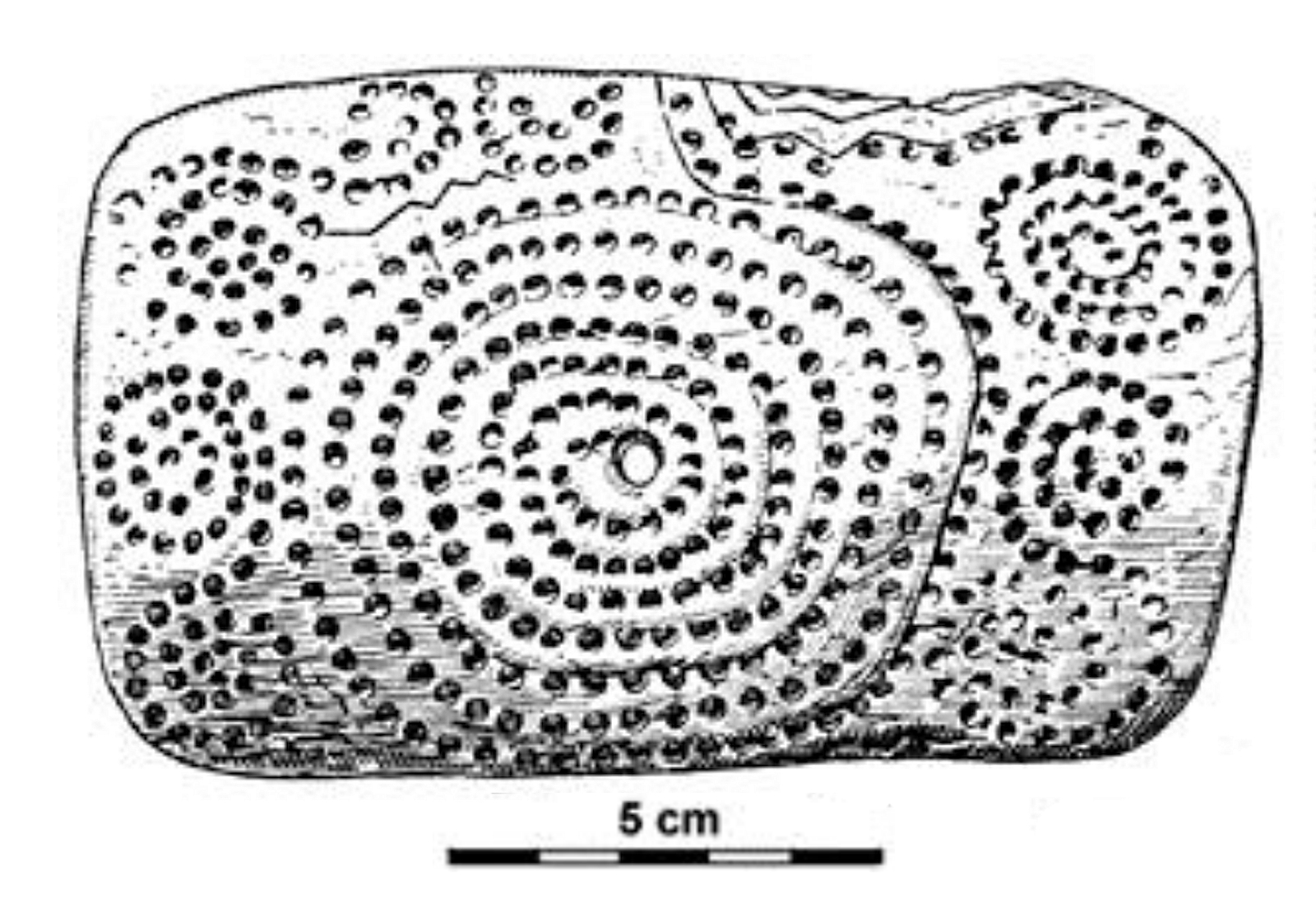
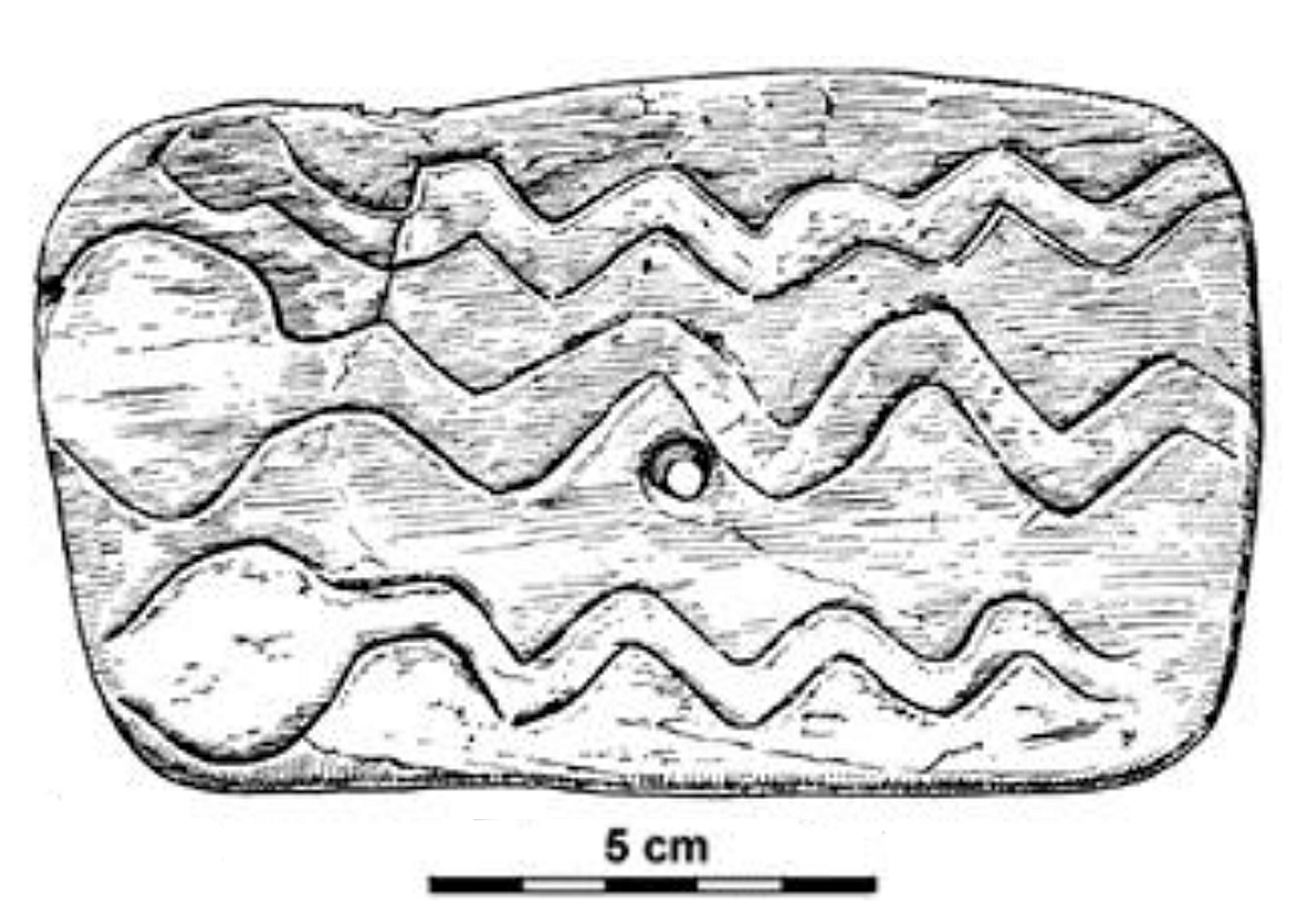
Mal'ta–Buret' culture centrally perforated ivory plaques with abstract circles, and three snakes According to archeologist Don Hitchcock "the snake is rare in northern hemisphere Paleolithic art, presumably because the cold conditions precluded a wide distribution of snakes. In addition, it can be seen that the snakes have very broad heads, as though they belong to the Cobra group - yet Cobras are now known only in southern asian localities." It has yet to be clarrified how the creators of these ivory plaques know snakes, or if there are other possible interpretations for these.

Since the term Ancient North Eurasian refers to a genetic bridge of connected mating networks, scholars of comparative mythology have argued that they probably shared myths and beliefs that could be reconstructed via the comparison of stories attested within cultures that were not in contact for millennia and stretched from the Pontic–Caspian steppe to the American continent.

The mytheme of the dog guarding the Otherworld possibly stems from an older Ancient North Eurasian belief, as suggested by similar motifs found in Indo-European, Native American and Siberian mythology. In many Native American religions, a fierce guard dog was located in the Milky Way, perceived as the path of souls in the afterlife, and getting past it was a test. The Siberian Chukchi and Tungusic peoples believed in a guardian-of-the-afterlife dog and a spirit dog that would absorb the dead man's soul and act as a guide in the afterlife. In Indo-European myths, the figure of the dog is embodied by Cerberus, Sarvarā, and Garmr. In Zoroastrianism, two four-eyed dogs guard the bridge to the afterlife called Chinvat Bridge. Anthony and Brown note that it might be one of the oldest mythemes recoverable through comparative mythology.

A second canid-related series of beliefs, myths and rituals connected dogs with healing rather than death. For instance, Ancient Near Eastern and Turkic-Kipchaq myths are prone to associate dogs with healing and generally categorised dogs as impure. A similar myth-pattern is assumed for the Eneolithic site of Botai in Kazakhstan, dated to 3500 BC, which might represent the dog as absorber of illness and guardian of the household against disease and evil. In Mesopotamia, the goddess Nintinugga, associated with healing, was accompanied or symbolized by dogs. Similar absorbent-puppy healing and sacrifice rituals were practiced in Greece and Italy, among the Hittites, again possibly influenced by Near Eastern traditions.

== See also ==
- Western Hunter-Gatherer
- Prehistory of Siberia

== Bibliography ==
- Anthony DW, Brown DR (2019). "Late Bronze Age midwinter dog sacrifices and warrior initiations at Krasnosamarskoe, Russia". In Olsen BA, Olander T, Kristiansen K (eds.). Tracing the Indo-Europeans: New evidence from archaeology and historical linguistics. Oxbow Books. ISBN 978-1-78925-273-6.
- Balter M (25 October 2013). "Ancient DNA Links Native Americans With Europe". Science. 342 (6157): 409–410. Bibcode:2013Sci...342..409B. doi:10.1126/science.342.6157.409. PMID 24159019.
- Bednarik R (19 June 2013). "Pleistocene Palaeoart of Asia". Arts. 2 (2): 46–76. doi:10.3390/arts2020046.
- Dolitsky AB, Ackerman RE, Aigner JS, Bryan AL, Dennell R, Guthrie RD, et al. (June 1985). "Siberian Paleolithic Archaeology: Approaches and Analytic Methods [and Comments and Replies]". Current Anthropology. 26 (3): 361–378. doi:10.1086/203280.
- Carlberg C, Hanel A (2020). "Skin colour and vitamin D: An update". Experimental Dermatology. 29 (9): 864–875. doi:10.1111/exd.14142. PMID 32621306.
- Flegontov P, Changmai P, Zidkova A, Logacheva MD, Altınışık NE, Flegontova O, et al. (11 February 2016). "Genomic study of the Ket: a Paleo-Eskimo-related ethnic group with significant ancient North Eurasian ancestry". Scientific Reports. 6 (1) 20768. arXiv:1508.03097. Bibcode:2016NatSR...620768F. doi:10.1038/srep20768. PMC 4750364. PMID 26865217.
- Fu Q, Posth C, Hajdinjak M, Petr M, Mallick S, Fernandes D, et al. (9 June 2016). "The genetic history of Ice Age Europe". Nature. 534 (7606): 200–205. Bibcode:2016Natur.534..200F. doi:10.1038/nature17993. PMC 4943878. PMID 27135931.
- Günther T, Malmström H, Svensson EM, Omrak A, Sánchez-Quinto F, Kılınç GM, et al. (9 January 2018). "Population genomics of Mesolithic Scandinavia: Investigating early postglacial migration routes and high-latitude adaptation". PLOS Biology. 16 (1) e2003703. doi:10.1371/journal.pbio.2003703. PMC 5760011. PMID 29315301.
- Haak W, Lazaridis I, Patterson N, Rohland N, Mallick S, Llamas B, et al. (2 March 2015). "Massive migration from the steppe was a source for Indo-European languages in Europe". Nature. 522 (7555): 207–211. arXiv:1502.02783. Bibcode:2015Natur.522..207H. doi:10.1038/nature14317. PMC 5048219. PMID 25731166.
- Guenther CA, Tasic B, Luo L, Bedell MA, Kingsley DM (July 2014). "A molecular basis for classic blond hair color in Europeans". Nature Genetics. 46 (7): 748–752. Bibcode:2014NaGen..46..748G. doi:10.1038/ng.2991. PMC 4704868. PMID 24880339.
- Grebenyuk PS, Fedorchenko AY, Dyakonov VM, Lebedintsev AI, Malyarchuk BA (2022). "Ancient Cultures and Migrations in Northeastern Siberia". Humans in the Siberian Landscapes. Springer Geography. pp. 89–133. doi:10.1007/978-3-030-90061-8_4. ISBN 978-3-030-90060-1.
- Jeong C, Wilkin S, Amgalantugs T, Bouwman AS, Taylor WT, Hagan RW, et al. (27 November 2018). "Bronze Age population dynamics and the rise of dairy pastoralism on the eastern Eurasian steppe". Proceedings of the National Academy of Sciences of the United States of America. 115 (48): E11248–E11255. Bibcode:2018PNAS..11511248J. doi:10.1073/pnas.1813608115. PMC 6275519. PMID 30397125.
- Jeong C, Balanovsky O, Lukianova E, Kahbatkyzy N, Flegontov P, Zaporozhchenko V, et al. (June 2019). "The genetic history of admixture across inner Eurasia". Nature Ecology & Evolution. 3 (6): 966–976. Bibcode:2019NatEE...3..966J. doi:10.1038/s41559-019-0878-2. PMC 6542712. PMID 31036896.
- Jeong C, Wang K, Wilkin S, Taylor WT, Miller BK, Ulziibayar S, et al. (26 March 2020). "A dynamic 6,000-year genetic history of Eurasia's Eastern Steppe". Cell. 183 (4): 890–904.e29. Bibcode:2020Cell..183..890J. bioRxiv 10.1101/2020.03.25.008078. doi:10.1016/j.cell.2020.10.015. hdl:21.11116/0000-0007-77BF-D. PMC 7664836. PMID 33157037.
- Kanzawa-Kiriyama H, Kryukov K, Jinam TA, Hosomichi K, Saso A, Suwa G, et al. (February 2017). "A partial nuclear genome of the Jomons who lived 3000 years ago in Fukushima, Japan". Journal of Human Genetics. 62 (2): 213–221. doi:10.1038/jhg.2016.110. PMC 5285490. PMID 27581845.
- Kozintsev AG (31 December 2020). "The Origin of the Okunev Population, Southern Siberia: The Evidence of Physical Anthropology and Genetics". Archaeology, Ethnology & Anthropology of Eurasia. 48 (4): 135–145. doi:10.17746/1563-0110.2020.48.4.135-145.
- Lazaridis I, Nadel D, Rollefson G, Merrett DC, Rohland N, Mallick S, et al. (25 July 2016). "Genomic insights into the origin of farming in the ancient Near East". Nature. 536 (7617): 419–424. Bibcode:2016Natur.536..419L. doi:10.1038/nature19310. PMC 5003663. PMID 27459054.
- Lbova L (2021). "The Siberian Paleolithic site of Mal'ta: a unique source for the study of childhood archaeology". Evolutionary Human Sciences. 3 e9. doi:10.1017/ehs.2021.5. PMC 10427291. PMID 37588521.
- Maier R, Flegontov P, Flegontova O, Isildak U, Changmai P, Reich D (2023). "On the limits of fitting complex models of population history to f-statistics". eLife. 12 e85492. Bibcode:2023eLife..1285492M. doi:10.7554/eLife.85492. PMC 10310323. PMID 37057893.
- Massilani D, Skov L, Hajdinjak M, Gunchinsuren B, Tseveendorj D, Yi S, et al. (30 October 2020). "Denisovan ancestry and population history of early East Asians". Science. 370 (6516): 579–583. doi:10.1126/science.abc1166. PMID 33122380.
- Mathieson I, Alpaslan-Roodenberg S, Posth C, Szécsényi-Nagy A, Rohland N, Mallick S, et al. (21 February 2018). "The genomic history of southeastern Europe". Nature. 555 (7695): 197–203. Bibcode:2018Natur.555..197M. doi:10.1038/nature25778. hdl:11392/2418484. PMC 6091220. PMID 29466330.
- Mathieson I (23 November 2015). "Genome-wide patterns of selection in 230 ancient Eurasians". Nature. 528 (7583). Nature Research: 499–503. Bibcode:2015Natur.528..499M. doi:10.1038/nature16152. PMC 4918750. PMID 26595274.
- Mittnik A (30 January 2018). "The genetic prehistory of the Baltic Sea region". Nature Communications. 9 (1) 442. Nature Research. Bibcode:2018NatCo...9..442M. doi:10.1038/s41467-018-02825-9. PMC 5789860. PMID 29382937.
- Moreno-Mayar JV, Vinner L, de Barros Damgaard P, de la Fuente C, Chan J, Spence JP, et al. (2018). "Early human dispersals within the Americas". Science. 362 (6419) eaav2621. Bibcode:2018Sci...362.2621M. doi:10.1126/science.aav2621. PMID 30409807.
- Moreno-Mayar JV, Potter BA, Vinner L, Steinrücken M, Rasmussen S, Terhorst J, et al. (2018). "Terminal Pleistocene Alaskan genome reveals first founding population of Native Americans" (PDF). Nature. 553 (7687): 203–207. Bibcode:2018Natur.553..203M. doi:10.1038/nature25173. PMID 29323294.
- Narasimhan VM (6 September 2019). "The formation of human populations in South and Central Asia". Science. 365 (6457) eaat7487. American Association for the Advancement of Science. Bibcode:2019Sci...365t7487N. bioRxiv 10.1101/292581. doi:10.1126/science.aat7487. PMC 6822619. PMID 31488661.
- Raghavan M, Skoglund P, Graf KE, Metspalu M, Albrechtsen A, Moltke I, et al. (January 2014). "Upper Palaeolithic Siberian genome reveals dual ancestry of Native Americans". Nature. 505 (7481): 87–91. Bibcode:2014Natur.505...87R. doi:10.1038/nature12736. PMC 4105016. PMID 24256729.
- Posth C, Yu H, Ghalichi A, Rougier H, Crevecoeur I, Huang Y, et al. (March 2023). "Palaeogenomics of Upper Palaeolithic to Neolithic European hunter-gatherers". Nature. 615 (7950): 117–126. Bibcode:2023Natur.615..117P. doi:10.1038/s41586-023-05726-0. PMC 9977688. PMID 36859578.
- Osada N, Kawai Y (2021). "Exploring models of human migration to the Japanese archipelago using genome-wide genetic data". Anthropological Science. 129 (1): 45–58. doi:10.1537/ase.201215.
- Vallini L, Marciani G, Aneli S, Bortolini E, Benazzi S, Pievani T, et al. (2022). "Genetics and Material Culture Support Repeated Expansions into Paleolithic Eurasia from a Population Hub Out of Africa". Genome Biology and Evolution. 14 (4) evac045. doi:10.1093/gbe/evac045. PMC 9021735. PMID 35445261.
- Villalba-Mouco V, van de Loosdrecht MS, Rohrlach AB, Fewlass H, Talamo S, Yu H, et al. (March 2023). "A 23,000-year-old southern Iberian individual links human groups that lived in Western Europe before and after the Last Glacial Maximum". Nature Ecology & Evolution. 7 (4): 597–609. Bibcode:2023NatEE...7..597V. doi:10.1038/s41559-023-01987-0. hdl:10230/57143. PMC 10089921. PMID 36859553.
- Wang CC (4 February 2019). "Ancient human genome-wide data from a 3000-year interval in the Caucasus corresponds with eco-geographic regions Eurasia". Nature Communications. 10 (1). Nature Research: 590. Bibcode:2019NatCo..10..590W. doi:10.1038/s41467-018-08220-8. PMC 6360191. PMID 30713341.
- Willerslev E, Meltzer DJ (June 2021). "Peopling of the Americas as inferred from ancient genomics". Nature. 594 (7863): 356–364. Bibcode:2021Natur.594..356W. doi:10.1038/s41586-021-03499-y. PMID 34135521.
- Wong EH, Khrunin A, Nichols L, Pushkarev D, Khokhrin D, Verbenko D, et al. (January 2017). "Reconstructing genetic history of Siberian and Northeastern European populations". Genome Research. 27 (1): 1–14. doi:10.1101/gr.202945.115. PMC 5204334. PMID 27965293.
- Yang MA, Fan X, Sun B, Chen C, Lang J, Ko YC, et al. (17 July 2020). "Ancient DNA indicates human population shifts and admixture in northern and southern China". Science. 369 (6501): 282–288. Bibcode:2020Sci...369..282Y. doi:10.1126/science.aba0909. PMID 32409524.
- Yang MA (6 January 2022). "A genetic history of migration, diversification, and admixture in Asia". Human Population Genetics and Genomics. 2 (1) 0001: 1–32. doi:10.47248/hpgg2202010001.
- Yu H, Spyrou MA, Karapetian M, Shnaider S, Radzevičiūtė R, Nägele K, et al. (June 2020). "Paleolithic to Bronze Age Siberians Reveal Connections with First Americans and across Eurasia". Cell. 181 (6): 1232–1245.e20. doi:10.1016/j.cell.2020.04.037. PMID 32437661.
- Zhang F, Ning C, Scott A, Fu Q, Bjørn R, Li W, et al. (11 November 2021). "The genomic origins of the Bronze Age Tarim Basin mummies". Nature. 599 (7884): 256–261. Bibcode:2021Natur.599..256Z. doi:10.1038/s41586-021-04052-7. PMC 8580821. PMID 34707286.
