= Upward Sun River site =

Archaeological site

Upward Sun River (USR)
- Xaasaa Na'
- Little Delta Dune, 49XBD-298
- Interactive map of Upward Sun River (USR)
- 64.2008°N 149.4937°W
- Type: multi-component site
- Periods: Late Pleistocene
- Cultures: Paleo-Arctic tradition
- Location: Tanana Valley, Alaska
- Region: Beringia

Site notes
- Excavation dates: 2010, 2013
- Archaeologists: Ben Potter

The Upward Sun River Site, or Xaasaa Na', is a Late Pleistocene archaeological site associated with the Paleo-Arctic tradition, located in the Tanana River Valley, Alaska. Dated to around 11,500 BP, Upward Sun River is the site of the oldest human remains discovered on the American side of Beringia. The site was first discovered in 2006.

The layer with the human remains at Upward Sun River is most similar to the level 6 layer from Ushki Lake, Kamchatka. Both sites are the only Beringian burials found so far from that period.

== Etymology ==
The name of the site, Upward Sun River, is a direct translation of the Middle Tanana name for the site, Xaasaa Na'. The Middle Tanana name was recorded from the mother of a mother-daughter pair, two of the last remaining speakers of Middle Tanana, during an interview in the 1960s.

== Human remains ==
The first excavation at Upward Sun River in 2010 yielded the cremated remains of a 3-year-old individual. The individual had been cremated inside a hearth, which was then filled in, with an abandonment of the site quickly afterwards. This individual was given the name Xaasaa Cheege Ts'eniin (Upward Sun River Mouth Child) by the local Healy Lake Tribe and is referred to by archaeologists as USR3. Researchers were unable to recover DNA from this individual.

=== Infant burials ===
In a 2013 excavation of the site, researchers discovered the remains of two female infants in a layer directly underneath the cremated individual. The two individuals were covered in red ochre and buried together in a pit burial with grave goods, including four decorated antler rods, two lithic dart points and bifaces. The antler rods and dart points were likely part of a weapon system. The two individuals were given the names Xach'itee'aanenh t'eede gaay (Sunrise child-girl) and Yełkaanenh t'eede gaay (Dawn twilight child-girl) by the local people and are referred to by archaeologists as USR1 and USR2, respectively.

One of the individuals (USR2) was a prenatal, possibly stillborn 30-week-old fetus, while the other (USR1) was a 6- to 12-week-old infant. The prenatal individual is the only prenate and youngest Late Pleistocene individual to be recovered in the Americas. All three died during the summer. Their teeth show features most similar to those found in Native Americans and Northeast Asians.

== Archaeogenetics ==
In 2015, researchers were able to extract the entire mitochondrial genome from both individuals. In 2018, researchers successfully sequenced the nuclear DNA from the petrous bone of both individuals, yielding around 17-fold coverage from USR1 and low coverage from USR2. Based on osteological analysis, the two infants were thought to be female; this assessment is corroborated by evidence from DNA analysis.

=== Comparisons with other populations ===
When compared with ancient populations, USR1 and USR2 show closest genetic affinity to Shuká Káa from On Your Knees Cave. USR1 shows extra genetic affinity for Siberians and East Asians in a way that is not found in later ancient individuals from the Americas such as Anzick-1, Kennewick Man, or the woman from the Lucy Islands dated to around 6,000 years ago. USR1 belongs to a population that predates the hypothesized splitting of ancient Native American populations into the Northern Native American and Southern Native American branches and does not cluster genetically with either later population. USR1 forms a distinct clade with the individual from Cave 2 of the Trail Creek Caves on the Seward Peninsula.

When compared with modern populations, USR1 shows closest genetic affinity to modern Native Americans, then Siberians and East Asians. USR1 does not cluster genetically with any modern Native American population. The genetic distance from USR1 to Mal'ta boy is the same as that from modern Native American populations to Mal'ta boy. USR1 shows additional genetic affinity for Denisovans that is not matched by modern Native Americans; this additional Denisovan affinity is likely due to sampling variation from an ancient population with higher levels of heterogenous Denisovan admixture.

=== Kinship ===
Nuclear DNA analysis suggests that USR1 and USR2 are closely related, probably somewhere roughly in the range from half-siblings to first cousins. However, mtDNA analysis shows that the two infants are not maternally related. The two infants carry mtDNA lineages that are only found in the Americas. USR1, the 6- to 12-week-old infant, comes from C1b. The prenatal infant, USR2, carries a basal lineage of Haplogroup B2 that is also matched by the individual from Trial Creek Cave; this specific mtDNA lineage is different from the derived B2 lineage generally found in the Americas.

Both individuals represent the northernmost discovery of these mtDNA lineages and show that the mtDNA diversity in the ancient population is higher than in the modern, lending credence to the Beringia Standstill Hypothesis.

=== Ancient Beringian ===
USR1 is thought to be representative of a hypothesized ancient population referred to as Ancient Beringian. Ancient Beringian is now considered to be composed of three individuals: USR1, USR2 and the 9,000 year-old individual from Trail Creek Cave. This genetic clustering is matched by the archaeological evidence, as the Upward Sun River Site and Trail Creek Cave, despite being located over 750 km (466 mi) away from each other, both share similarities in artefact technology. Based on DNA analysis of USR1, the Ancient Beringians are hypothesized to have split off from East Asians around 36,000 years ago, with continuous gene flow occurring until around 25,000 years ago. The Ancient Beringians are also hypothesized to have diverged from the ancestors of Native Americans around 22,000 to 18,100 years ago.

=== Phenotypic analysis ===
Phenotypic analysis shows that USR1 does not carry the derived EDAR allele commonly found in modern East Asians and Native Americans. However, USR1 does carry the derived rs174570 FADS2 allele that was targeted by a selective sweep.

== Salmon ==
Around 300 bone fragments from salmonids were recovered at Upward Sun River, representing the earliest surviving evidence of salmon eating in North America. DNA analysis types the salmon remains as coming from Oncorhynchus keta (chum salmon). Isotopic analysis shows that the salmon were anadromous.

== Other material remains ==
An obsidian flake discovered as part of the grave goods found in the infant burial was chemically identified as coming from the Hoodoo Mountain primary source site in Kluane National Park, Yukon, Canada, a location 600 km (370 mi) away from the Upward Sun River Site.

== See also ==
- Brooks Falls

== Bibliography ==
- "Ancient babies boost Bering land bridge layover". University of Utah. Oct 26, 2015.
- Handwerk, Brian (Feb 25, 2011). "Ice Age Child Found in Prehistoric Alaskan Home". National Geographic. Archived from the original on 2011-02-27.
- Horne, Naomi (Sep 21, 2015a). "Earliest evidence of ancient North American salmon fishing verified". University of Alaska Fairbanks.
- Horne, Naomi (Oct 26, 2015b). "Ancient Alaska infants' DNA supports human migration theory". University of Alaska Fairbanks.
- Moreno-Mayar, J. Víctor; Potter, Ben A.; Vinner, Lasse; et al. (Jan 3, 2018a). "Terminal Pleistocene Alaskan genome reveals first founding population of Native Americans" (PDF). Nature. 553 (7687): 203–207. Bibcode:2018Natur.553..203M. doi:10.1038/nature25173. ISSN 0028-0836. PMID 29323294. S2CID 4454580. (Supplementary)
- Moreno-Mayar, J. Víctor; Vinner, Lasse; de Barros Damgaard, Peter; et al. (Nov 8, 2018b). "Early human dispersals within the Americas". Science. 362 (6419) eaav2621. American Association for the Advancement of Science (AAAS). Bibcode:2018Sci...362.2621M. doi:10.1126/science.aav2621. ISSN 0036-8075. PMID 30409807.
- Potter, Ben A.; Irish, Joel D.; Reuther, Joshua D.; et al. (Feb 25, 2011). "A Terminal Pleistocene Child Cremation and Residential Structure from Eastern Beringia". Science. 331 (6020): 1058–1062. Bibcode:2011Sci...331.1058P. doi:10.1126/science.1201581. PMID 21350175. S2CID 206531808.
- Posth, Cosimo; Nakatsuka, Nathan; Lazaridis, Iosif; et al. (2018). "Reconstructing the Deep Population History of Central and South America". Cell. 175 (5). Elsevier BV: 1185–1197.e22. doi:10.1016/j.cell.2018.10.027. ISSN 0092-8674. PMC 6327247. PMID 30415837.
- Potter, Ben; Sattler, Robert (Nov 10, 2014). "Upward Sun River Site Frequently Asked Questions". Tanana Chiefs Conference. Archived from the original on 2016-03-04.
- Potter, Ben A.; Irish, Joel (Dec 2, 2014). "New insights into Eastern Beringian mortuary behavior: A terminal Pleistocene double infant burial at Upward Sun River". PNAS. 111 (48): 17060–17065. Bibcode:2014PNAS..11117060P. doi:10.1073/pnas.1413131111. PMC 4260572. PMID 25385599.
- Scheib, C. L.; Li, Hongjie; Desai, Tariq; et al. (Jun 1, 2018). "Ancient human parallel lineages within North America contributed to a coastal expansion". Science. 360 (6392): 1024–1027. Bibcode:2018Sci...360.1024S. doi:10.1126/science.aar6851. ISSN 0036-8075. PMID 29853687.
- Thompson, Helen (Nov 10, 2014). "Ice Age Babies Surrounded by Weapon Parts Found in Alaska". Smithsonian.
- Wren, Kathy (Feb 24, 2011). "Science: Child's Cremation Site Reveals Domestic Life in Paleoindian Alaska". American Association for the Advancement of Science.
