= Paleo-Arctic tradition =

Tradition of earliest humans in North American Arctic

The Paleo-Arctic Tradition is the name given by archaeologists to the cultural tradition of the earliest well-documented human occupants of the North American Arctic, which date from the period 8000–5000 BC. The tradition covers Alaska, and expands far into the east, west, and the Southwest Yukon Territory of Canada.

The Upward Sun River site, a Late Pleistocene archaeological site associated with the Paleo-Arctic Tradition, located in the Tanana Valley, Alaska has now been dated to around 11,500 BP. Upward Sun River is the site of the oldest human remains discovered on the American side of Beringia.

Around 8000 BC, Alaska was still connected to Siberia with the landbridge, located in the current Bering Strait. People who inhabited this region in Alaska were of the Dyuktai tradition, originally located in Siberia. Eventually, the Dyuktai changed into the Sumnagin culture, a hunting/fishing group, whose culture was defined by possessing a new technology. Other cultures flourished as well, all being placed under the general category of the Paleo-Arctic tradition.

"The Paleo-Arctic tradition is still a shadowy entity, a patchwork of local Early Holocene cultural traditions that flourished over an enormous area of extreme northwestern North America for at least 4000 years, and longer in many places. Other terms such as the Northwest Microblade tradition, Denali Complex, and Beringian tradition have been used to describe these same general adaptations, but Paleo-Arctic is the most appropriate because it is the kind of general label that reflects a great variety of different human adaptations during a period of increasing environmental diversity and change".

The Paleo-Arctic is mostly known for lithic remains (stone technology). Some artifacts found include microblades, small wedge-shaped cores, some leaf-shaped bifaces, scrapers, and graving tools. The microblades were used as hunting weapons and were mounted in wood, antler, or bone points. Paleo-Arctic stone specialists also created bifaces that were used as tools and as cores for the production of large artifact blanks. Little evidence remains of the culture's settlement patterns, because many of the settlements were inundated by the rising sea levels of the Holocene; however, remains of stone tools were discovered, giving indirect evidence of settlement sites.

== Nenana Complex ==
The Nenana Complex is the oldest part of the Paleo-Arctic Tradition. This unique cultural complex has only ever been documented on cobble bedrock beneath every soil horizon, all of which were deposited after the Last Glacial Maximum. This means archeologists cannot reliably discern the context of this complex as either the original soil horizon layers on which they may have been deposited eroded away during the katabatic winds of the Last Glacial Maximum in this region, or these artifacts were deposited sometime during or just after the Last Glacial Maximum. The lack of context means this cultural complex cannot and has never been reliably dated. Despite decades of various archeologists attempting to use geology to locate soil horizons undisturbed by the Last Glacial Maximum to locate the Nenana Culture, it has yet to be discovered in situ.

The implications of this complex possibly predating the Last Glacial Maximum would make it the oldest human cultural complex in the Western Hemisphere. However, how old cannot be determined. It is more likely this complex predates the Last Glacial Maximum as the likelihood of these artifacts being deposited during or after the Last Glacial Maximum, yet before soils began to be redeposited, is less likely than that they were deposited before as the climate in those date ranges would have been uninhabitable.

It has been found at the Dry Creek, Moose Creek, and Walker Road archaeological sites and is characterized by bifacially flaked, unfluted spear points. The complex also includes bifacially worked knives and unifacially retouched lithic flakes lacking microblades that generally resemble similar lithics found in sites of the Kamchatka Peninsula in Russia, possibly due to migration and cultural exchange over the Bering land bridge.

== Denali Complex ==
The Denali Complex denotes a more recent part of the Paleo-Arctic Tradition dated to 10,000 BP. Although it is found in similar sites to the Nenana Complex such as the Dry Creek archaeological site, it is distinguished stratigraphically and through the presence of microblades, wedge-shaped lithic cores, and burins.

== See also ==
- Paleo-Indians
- Archaeology of the Americas
- List of archaeological periods (North America)
- Upward Sun River site
