= Silk Road =

Historical network of Eurasian trade routes

- Main routes of the Silk Road

Route information
- Time period: c. 114 BCE – c. 1450 CE; 2140 years ago

UNESCO World Heritage Site
- Official name: Silk Roads: the Routes Network of Chang'an-Tianshan Corridor
- Type: Cultural
- Criteria: ii, iii, v, vi
- Designated: 2014 (38th session)
- Reference no.: 1442
- Region: Asia-Pacific

UNESCO World Heritage Site
- Official name: Silk Roads: Zarafshan-Karakum Corridor
- Type: Cultural
- Criteria: ii, iii, v
- Designated: 2023 (45th session)
- Reference no.: 1675
- Region: Asia-Pacific

Chinese name
- Traditional Chinese: 絲綢之路
- Simplified Chinese: 丝绸之路
Transcriptions
Standard Mandarin
- Hanyu Pinyin: Sīchóu zhī lù
- Wade–Giles: Ssu^{1} ch&#x^{02}BB;ou^{1} chih^{1} lu^{4}

The Silk Road (Note: Simplified Chinese: 丝绸之路; traditional Chinese: 絲綢之路; pinyin: Sīchóu zhī lù Kazakh: Ұлы Жібек жолы; Uzbek: Buyuk Ipak yoʻli; Persian: جاده ابریشم; Italian: Via della seta) was a network of Asian trade routes active from the second century BCE until the mid-15th century. Spanning over 6,400 km (4,000 mi) on land, it played a central role in facilitating economic, cultural, political, and religious interactions between the Eastern and Western worlds. The name "Silk Road" was coined in the late 19th century, but some 20th- and 21st-century historians instead prefer the term Silk Routes, on the grounds that it more accurately describes the intricate web of land and sea routes connecting Central, East, South, Southeast, and West Asia as well as East Africa and Southern Europe.

The Silk Road derives its name from the highly lucrative trade of silk textiles that were primarily produced in China. The network began with the expansion of the Han dynasty (202 BCE – 220 CE) into Central Asia around 114 BCE, through the missions and explorations of the Chinese imperial envoy Zhang Qian, which brought the region under unified control. The Chinese took great interest in the security of their trade products, and extended the Great Wall of China to ensure the protection of the trade route. The Parthian Empire provided a vital bridge connecting the network to the Mediterranean. Meanwhile, the rise of the Roman Empire in the west further established the western terminus of the interconnected trade system. By the first century CE, Chinese silk was widely sought after in Rome, Egypt, and Greece. Other lucrative commodities from the East included tea, dyes, perfumes, and porcelain; among Western exports were horses, camels, honey, wine, and gold. Aside from generating substantial wealth for emerging mercantile classes, the proliferation of goods such as paper and gunpowder greatly affected the trajectory of political history in several theatres in Eurasia and beyond.

The Silk Road was utilized over a period that saw immense political variation across the continent, exemplified by major events such as the Black Death and the Mongol conquests. The network was highly decentralized, and security was sparse: travelers faced constant threats of banditry and nomadic raiders, and long expanses of inhospitable terrain. Few individuals traveled the entire length of the Silk Road, instead relying on a succession of middlemen based at various stopping points along the way. In addition to goods, the network facilitated an unprecedented exchange of religious (especially Buddhist), philosophical, and scientific thought, much of which was syncretised by societies along the way. Likewise, a wide variety of people used the routes. Diseases such as plague also spread along the Silk Road, possibly contributing to the Black Death.

From 1453 onwards, the Ottoman Empire began competing with other gunpowder empires for greater control over the overland routes, which prompted European polities to seek alternatives while themselves gaining leverage over their trade partners. This marked the beginning of the Age of Discovery, European colonialism, and the further intensification of globalization. In the 21st century, the name "New Silk Road" is used to describe several large infrastructure projects along many of the historic trade routes; among the best known are the Eurasian Land Bridge and the Chinese Belt and Road Initiative (BRI). UNESCO designated the Chang'an-Tianshan corridor of the Silk Road as a World Heritage Site in 2014, and the Zarafshan-Karakum Corridor in 2023. The Fergana-Syrdarya Corridor, the Indian and Iranian portions, and the remaining sites in China remain on the tentative lists.

Despite the popular imagination, Silk Road was never a singular east-west trade route that linked China to the Mediterranean, nor was there unrestricted trade before the Mongol Empire. It was a network of routes. Even Marco Polo, often linked to the Silk Road, never used the term despite traveling during a time of Mongol-enabled ease of movement. Some scholars criticise or even dismiss the idea of silk roads and call for a new definition or alternate term. According to them, the literature using this term has "privileged the sedentary and literate empires at either end of Eurasia" thereby ignoring the contributions of steppe nomads. In addition, the classic definition sidelines prominent civilisations such as India and Iran.

== Name and contested significance ==
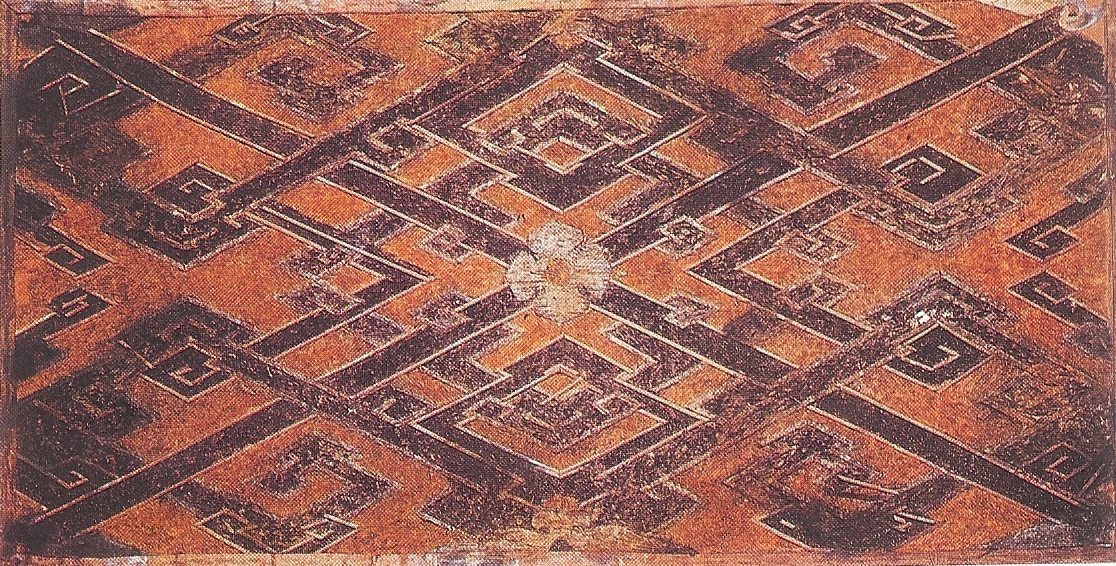
Woven silk textile from Tomb No. 1 at Mawangdui, Changsha, Hunan province, China, dated to the Western Han Era, 2nd century BCE

The Silk Road derives its name from the lucrative trade in silk, first developed in China, and a major reason for the connection of trade routes into an extensive transcontinental network. It derives from the German term Seidenstraße (literally "Silk Road") and was first popularized in 1877 by Ferdinand von Richthofen, who made seven expeditions to China from 1868 to 1872. However, the term itself had been in use in decades prior to that. The alternative translation "Silk Route" is also used occasionally. Although the term was coined in the 19th century, it did not gain widespread acceptance in academia or popularity among the public until the 20th century. The first book entitled The Silk Road was by Swedish geographer Sven Hedin in 1938.

The use of the term 'Silk Road' is not without its detractors. For instance, Warwick Ball contends that the maritime spice trade with India and Arabia was far more consequential for the economy of the Roman Empire than the silk trade with China, which at sea was conducted mostly through India and on land was handled by numerous intermediaries such as the Sogdians. Going as far as to call the whole thing a "myth" of modern academia, Ball argues that there was no coherent overland trade system and no free movement of goods from East Asia to the West until the period of the Mongol Empire. He notes that traditional authors discussing east–west trade such as Marco Polo and Edward Gibbon never labelled any route a "silk" one in particular. William Dalrymple points out that in pre-modern times, maritime travel cost only a fifth of overland transport, and argues for the pre-13th century primacy of an India-dominated "Golden Road" extending from Rome to Japan.

The southern stretches of the Silk Road, from Khotan (Xinjiang) to Eastern China, were first used for jade and not silk, as long as 5000 BCE, and are still in use for this purpose. The term "Jade Road" would have been more appropriate than "Silk Road" had it not been for the far larger and geographically wider nature of the silk trade; the term is in current use in China.

== Routes ==
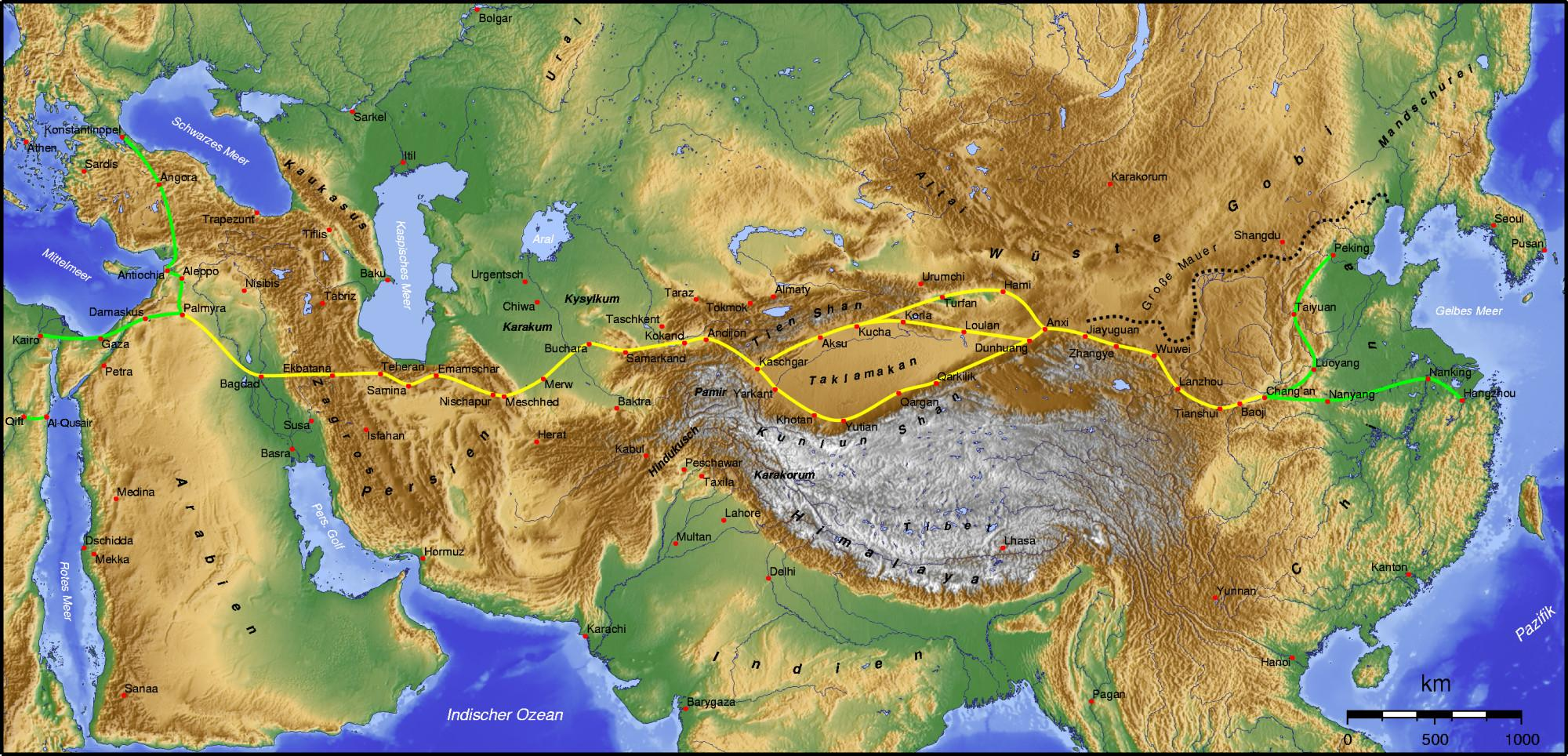
Main routes of the Silk Road on a relief map, with city and region names labeled

Two important Silk Road paths from Merv went through Nisa and Sarakhs. They joined together in Mashhad, a big religious and trade city in Khurasan. The old road—now a modern highway—went from Mashhad to Nishapur, then along the edge of the Dasht-e Kevir desert and the Alborz Mountains, reaching Tehran (called Ray in ancient times).

The Silk Road consisted of several routes. As it extended westwards from the ancient commercial centres of China, the overland, intercontinental Silk Road divided into northern and southern routes bypassing the Taklamakan Desert and Lop Nur. Merchants along these routes were involved in "relay trade" in which goods changed "hands many times before reaching their final destinations".

=== Northern route ===
The Silk Road in the 1st century

The northern route started at Chang'an (now called Xi'an), an ancient capital of China that was moved further east during the Later Han to Luoyang. The route was defined around the 1st century BCE when Han Wudi put an end to harassment by nomadic tribes.

The northern route travelled northwest through the Chinese province of Gansu from Shaanxi Province and split into three further routes, two of them following the mountain ranges to the north and south of the Taklamakan Desert to rejoin at Kashgar, and the other going north of the Tian Shan mountains through Turpan, Talgar, and Almaty (in what is now southeast Kazakhstan). The routes split again west of Kashgar, with a southern branch heading down Erkeshtam and the Alay Valley towards Termez (in modern Uzbekistan) and Balkh (Afghanistan), while the other travelled through Torugart Pass to Kokand in the Fergana Valley (in present-day eastern Uzbekistan) and then west across the Karakum Desert. Both routes joined the main southern route before reaching ancient Merv, Turkmenistan. Another branch of the northern route turned northwest past the Aral Sea and north of the Caspian Sea, then and on to the Black Sea.

A route for caravans, the northern Silk Road brought to China many goods such as "dates, saffron powder and pistachio nuts from Persia; frankincense, aloes and myrrh from Somalia; sandalwood from India; glass bottles from Egypt, and other expensive and desirable goods from other parts of the world." In exchange, the caravans sent back bolts of silk brocade, lacquer-ware, and porcelain.

=== Southern route ===
The southern route or Karakoram route was mainly a single route from China through the Karakoram mountains, where it persists in modern times as the Karakoram Highway, a paved road through Khunjerab Pass that connects Pakistan and China. It then set off westwards, but with southward spurs so travelers could complete the journey by sea from various points. Crossing the high mountains, it passed through northern Pakistan, over the Hindu Kush mountains, and into Afghanistan, rejoining the northern route near Merv, Turkmenistan. From Merv, it followed a nearly straight line west through mountainous northern Iran, Mesopotamia, and the northern tip of the Syrian Desert to the Levant, where Mediterranean trading ships plied regular routes to Italy, while land routes went either north through Anatolia or south to North Africa. Another branch road travelled from Herat through Susa to Charax Spasinu at the head of the Persian Gulf and across to Petra and on to Alexandria and other eastern Mediterranean ports from where ships carried the cargoes to Rome.

=== Southwestern route ===
The southwestern route is believed to be the Ganges/Brahmaputra Delta, which has been the subject of international interest for over two millennia. Strabo, the 1st-century Roman writer, mentions the deltaic lands: "Regarding merchants who now sail from Egypt ... as far as the Ganges, they are only private citizens." His comments are interesting as Roman beads and other materials are being found at Wari-Bateshwar ruins, the ancient city with roots from much earlier, before the Bronze Age, presently being slowly excavated beside the Old Brahmaputra in Bangladesh. Ptolemy's map of the Ganges Delta, a remarkably accurate effort, showed that his informants knew all about the course of the Brahmaputra River, crossing through the Himalayas then bending westward to its source in Tibet. It is doubtless that this delta was a major international trading center, almost certainly from much earlier than the Common Era. Gemstones and other merchandise from Thailand and Java were traded in the delta and through it. Chinese archaeological writer Bin Yang and some earlier writers and archaeologists, such as Janice Stargardt, strongly suggest this route of international trade as Sichuan–Yunnan–Burma–Bangladesh route. According to Bin Yang, especially from the 12th century, the route was used to ship bullion from Yunnan (gold and silver are among the minerals in which Yunnan is rich), through northern Burma, into modern Bangladesh, making use of the ancient route, known as the 'Ledo' route. The emerging evidence of the ancient cities of Bangladesh, in particular Wari-Bateshwar ruins, Mahasthangarh, Bhitagarh, Bikrampur, Egarasindhur, and Sonargaon, are believed to be the international trade centers in this route.

=== Maritime route ===
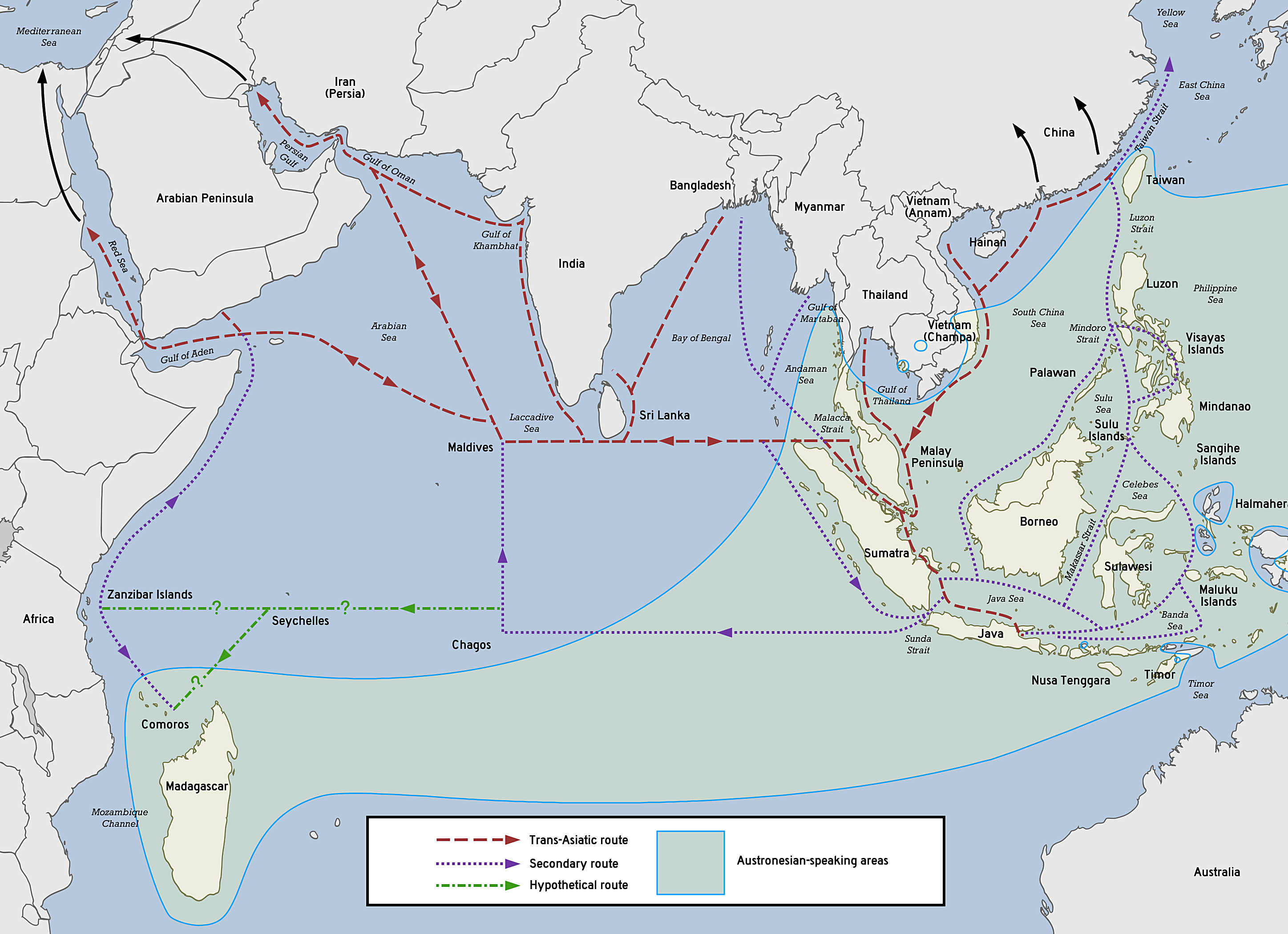
Austronesian proto-historic and historic (Maritime Silk Road) maritime trade network in Southeast Asia and the Indian Ocean

The Maritime Silk Road or Maritime Silk Route is the maritime section of the historic Silk Road that connected Southeast Asia, East Asia, the Indian subcontinent, the Arabian Peninsula, eastern Africa, and Europe. It began by the 2nd century BCE and flourished until the 15th century CE. The Maritime Silk Road was primarily established and operated by Austronesian sailors in Southeast Asia who sailed large long-distance ocean-going sewn-plank and lashed-lug trade ships. The route was also utilized by the dhows of the Persian and Arab traders in the Arabian Sea and beyond, and the Tamil merchants in South Asia. China also started building their own trade ships (chuán) and followed the routes in the later period, from the 10th to the 15th centuries CE.

The network followed the footsteps of older Austronesian maritime jade networks in Southeast Asia, as well as the maritime spice networks between Southeast Asia and South Asia, and the West Asian maritime networks in the Arabian Sea and beyond, coinciding with these ancient maritime trade roads by the current era.

Austronesian thalassocracies controlled the flow of trade in the eastern regions of the Maritime Silk Road, especially the polities around the straits of Malacca and Bangka, the Malay Peninsula, and the Mekong Delta; through which passed the main routes of the Austronesian trade ships to Giao Chỉ (in the Tonkin Gulf) and Guangzhou (southern China), the endpoints (later also including Quanzhou by the 10th century CE). Secondary routes also passed through the coastlines of the Gulf of Thailand; as well as through the Java Sea, Celebes Sea, Banda Sea, and the Sulu Sea, reconnecting with the main route through the northern Philippines and Taiwan. The secondary routes also continue onward to the East China Sea and the Yellow Sea for a limited extent.

The main route of the western regions of the Maritime Silk Road directly crosses the Indian Ocean from the northern tip of Sumatra (or through the Sunda Strait) to Sri Lanka, southern India and Bangladesh, and the Maldives. It branches from here into routes through the Arabian Sea entering the Gulf of Oman (into the Persian Gulf), and the Gulf of Aden (into the Red Sea). Secondary routes also pass through the coastlines of the Bay of Bengal, the Arabian Sea, and southwards along the coast of East Africa to Zanzibar, the Comoros, Madagascar, and the Seychelles.

The term "Maritime Silk Road" is a modern name, acquired from its similarity to the overland Silk Road. Like the overland routes, the ancient maritime routes through Southeast Asia and the Indian Ocean had no particular name for the majority of its very long history. Despite the modern name, the Maritime Silk Road involved exchanges in a wide variety of goods over a very wide region, not just silk or Asian exports. It differed significantly in several aspects from the overland Silk Road, and thus should not be viewed as a mere extension of it. Traders traveling through the Maritime Silk Road could span the entire distance of the maritime routes, instead of through regional relays as with the overland route. Ships could carry far larger amounts of goods, creating greater economic impact with each exchange. Goods carried by the ships also differed from goods carried by caravans. Traders on the maritime route faced different perils like weather and piracy, but they were not affected by political instability and could simply avoid areas in conflict.

== History ==
=== Precursors ===
==== Chinese and Central Asian contacts (2nd millennium BCE) ====
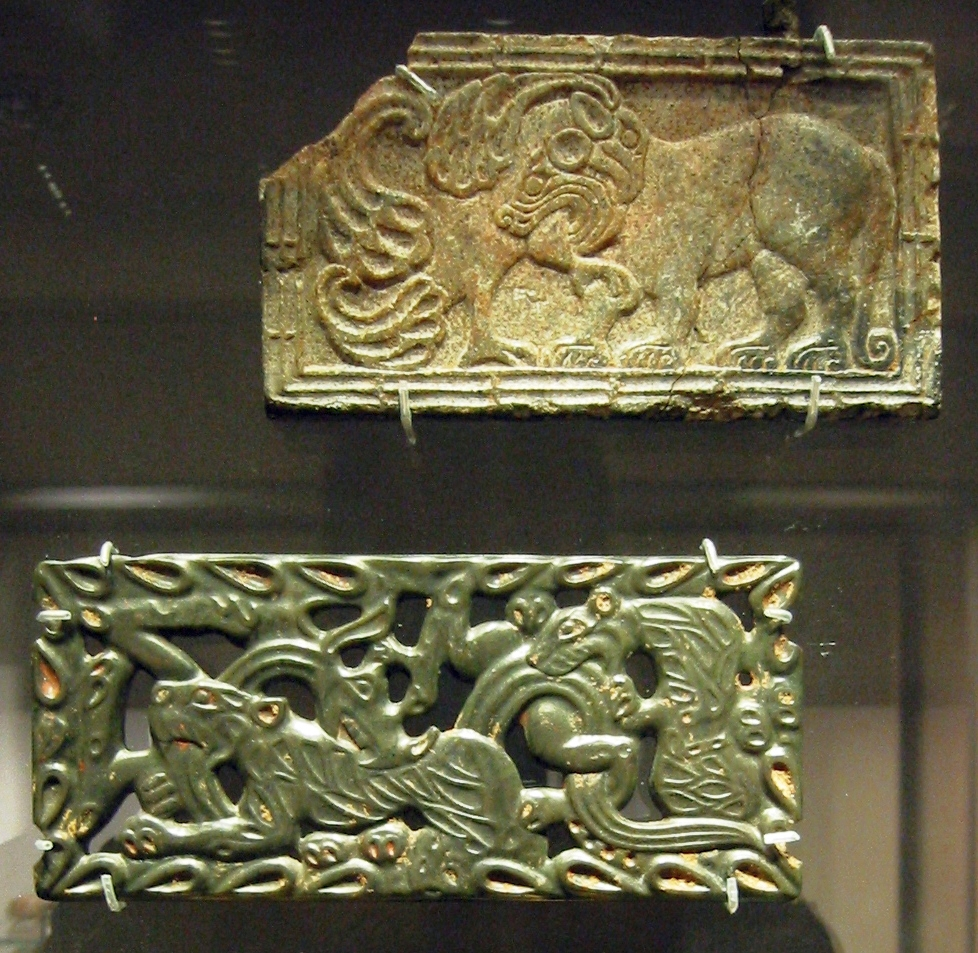
Chinese jade and steatite plaques, in the Scythian-style animal art of the steppes. 4th–3rd century BCE. British Museum.

Central Eurasia has been known from ancient times for its horse riding and horse breeding communities, and the overland Steppe Route across the northern steppes of Central Eurasia was in use long before that of the Silk Road. Archeological sites, such as the Berel burial ground in Kazakhstan, confirmed that the nomadic Arimaspians were not only breeding horses for trade but also produced great craftsmen able to propagate exquisite art pieces along the Silk Road. From the 2nd millennium BCE, nephrite jade was being traded from mines in the region of Yarkand and Khotan to China. Significantly, these mines were not very far from the lapis lazuli and spinel ("Balas Ruby") mines in Badakhshan, and, although separated by the formidable Pamir Mountains, routes across them were in use from very early times.

Genetic study of the Tarim mummies, found in the Tarim Basin, in the area of Loulan located along the Silk Road 200 kilometres (124 miles) east of Yingpan, dating to as early as 1600 BCE, suggest very ancient contacts between East and West. These mummified remains may have been of people who spoke Indo-European languages, which remained in use in the Tarim Basin, in the modern day Xinjiang region, until replaced by Turkic influences from the Xiongnu culture to the north and by Chinese influences from the eastern Han dynasty, who spoke a Sino-Tibetan language.

Some remnants of what was probably Chinese silk dating from 1070 BCE have been found in Ancient Egypt. The Great Oasis cities of Central Asia played a crucial role in the effective functioning of the Silk Road trade. The originating source seems sufficiently reliable, but silk degrades very rapidly, so it cannot be verified whether it was cultivated silk (which almost certainly came from China) or a type of wild silk, which might have come from the Mediterranean or Middle East.

Following contacts between China and nomadic groups along its western borders in the 8th century BCE, gold was introduced from Central Asia, and Chinese jade carvers began to imitate steppe designs, adopting the Scythian-style animal art depicting animals locked in combat. This style is particularly reflected in the rectangular belt plaques made of gold and bronze, with other versions in jade and steatite. An elite 6th century BCE burial near Stuttgart, Germany, contained Greek bronzes as well as Chinese silks. Similar animal-shaped pieces of art and wrestler motifs on belts have been found in Scythian grave sites stretching from the Black Sea region all the way to Warring States era archaeological sites in Inner Mongolia (at Aluchaideng) and Shaanxi (at Keshengzhuang) in China.

The expansion of Scythian cultures, stretching from the Hungarian plain and the Carpathian Mountains to the Chinese Gansu Corridor, and linking the Middle East with Northern India and the Punjab, undoubtedly played an important role in the development of the Silk Road. Scythians accompanied the Assyrian Esarhaddon on his invasion of Egypt, and their distinctive triangular arrowheads have been found as far south as Aswan. These nomadic peoples were dependent upon neighbouring settled populations for a number of important technologies, and in addition to raiding vulnerable settlements for these commodities, they also encouraged long-distance merchants as a source of income through the enforced payment of tariffs. Sogdians played a major role in facilitating trade between China and Central Asia along the Silk Roads as late as the 10th century, their language serving as a lingua franca for Asian trade as far back as the 4th century.

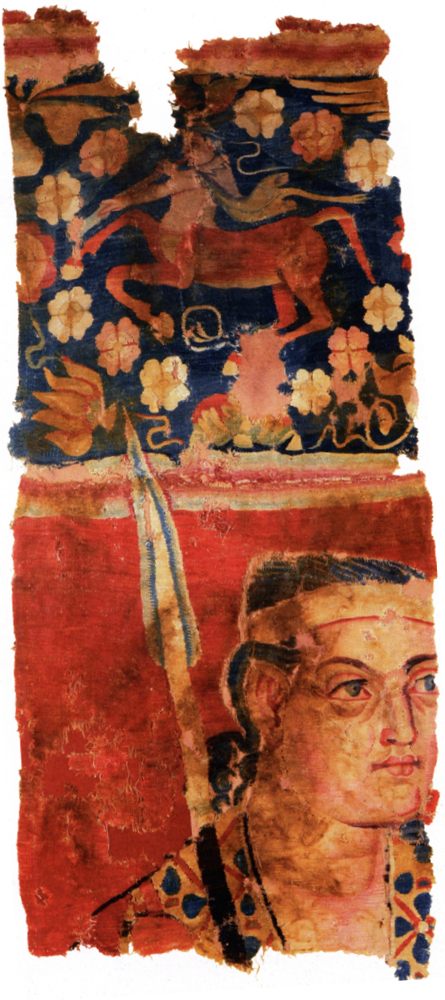
Soldier with a centaur in the Sampul tapestry, wool wall hanging, 3rd–2nd century BCE, Xinjiang Museum, Urumqi, Xinjiang, China.

=== Initiation in China (130 BCE) ===
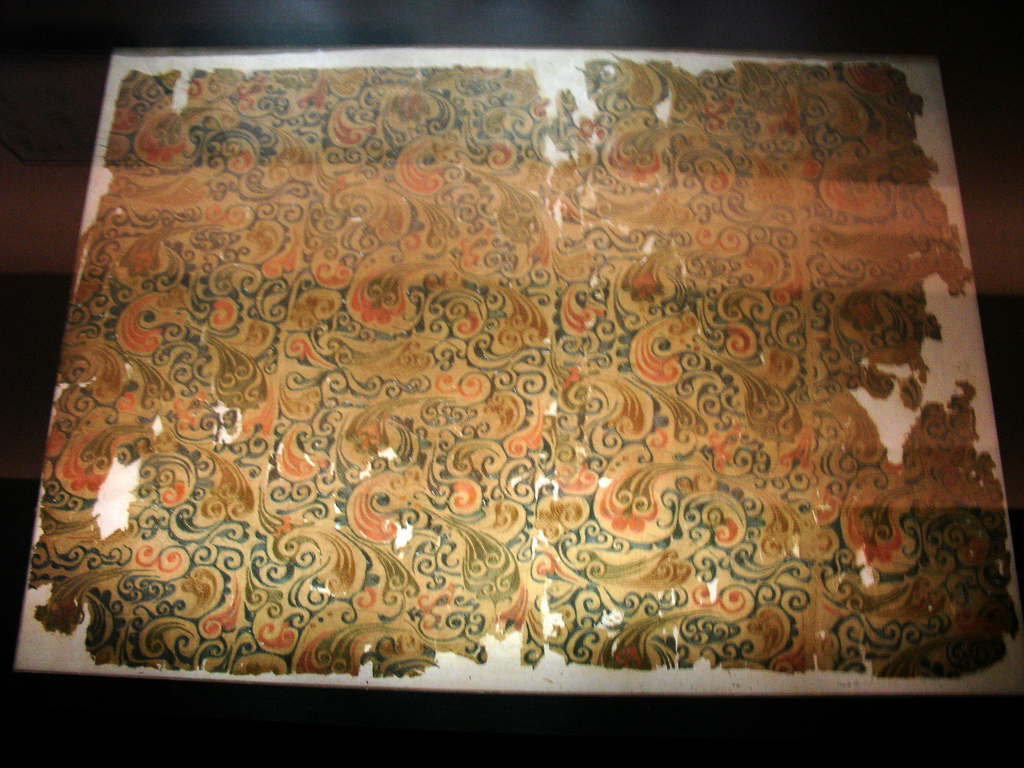
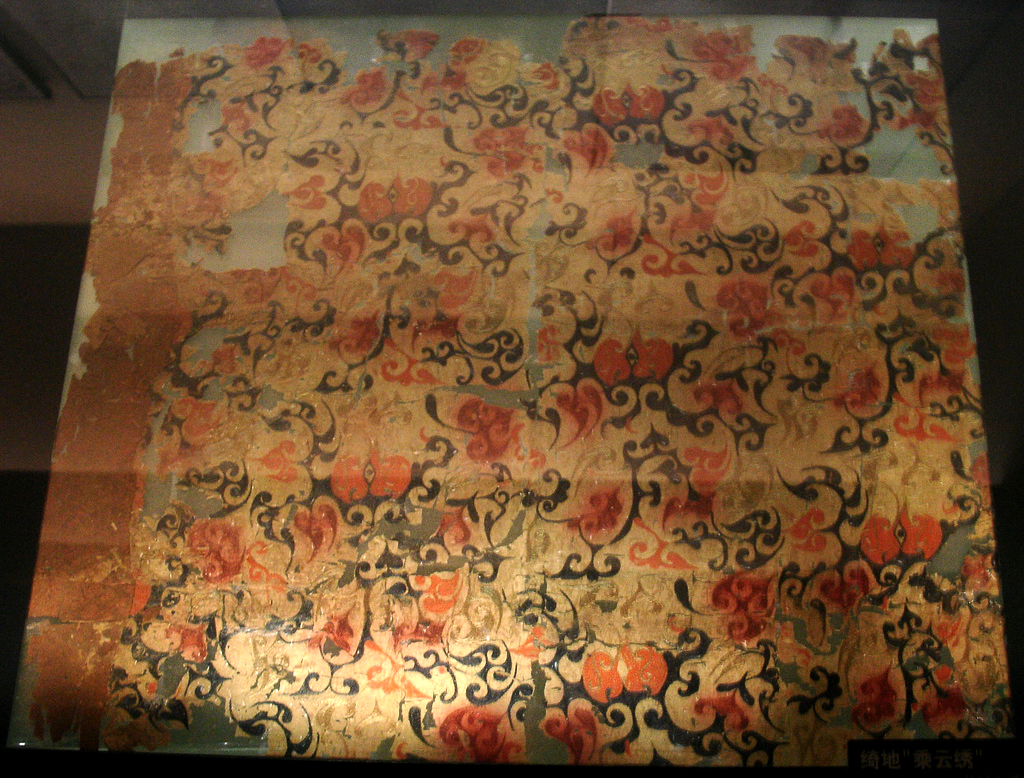
Woven silk textiles from Tomb No. 1 at Mawangdui, Changsha, Hunan province, China, Western Han dynasty period, dated 2nd century BCE

The Silk Road was initiated and spread by China's Han dynasty through exploration and conquests in Central Asia. With the Mediterranean linked to the Fergana Valley, the next step was to open a route across the Tarim Basin and the Hexi Corridor to China Proper. This extension came around 130 BCE, with the embassies of the Han dynasty to Central Asia following the reports of the ambassador Zhang Qian (who was originally sent to obtain an alliance with the Yuezhi against the Xiongnu). Zhang Qian visited directly the kingdom of Dayuan in Ferghana, the territories of the Yuezhi in Transoxiana, the Bactrian country of Daxia with its remnants of Greco-Bactrian rule, and Kangju. He also made reports on neighbouring countries that he did not visit, such as Anxi (Parthia), Tiaozhi (Mesopotamia), Shendu (Indian subcontinent) and the Wusun. Zhang Qian's report suggested the economic reason for Chinese expansion and wall-building westward, and trail-blazed the Silk Road, making it one of the most famous trade routes in history and in the world.

After winning the War of the Heavenly Horses and the Han–Xiongnu War, Chinese armies established themselves in Central Asia, initiating the Silk Route as a major avenue of international trade. Some say that the Chinese Emperor Wu became interested in developing commercial relationships with the sophisticated urban civilizations of Ferghana, Bactria, and the Parthian Empire: "The Son of Heaven on hearing all this reasoned thus: Ferghana (Dayuan "Great Ionians") and the possessions of Bactria (Ta-Hsia) and Parthian Empire (Anxi) are large countries, full of rare things, with a population living in fixed abodes and given to occupations somewhat identical with those of the Chinese people, but with weak armies, and placing great value on the rich produce of China" (Hou Hanshu, Later Han History). Others say that Emperor Wu was mainly interested in fighting the Xiongnu and that major trade began only after the Chinese pacified the Hexi Corridor.

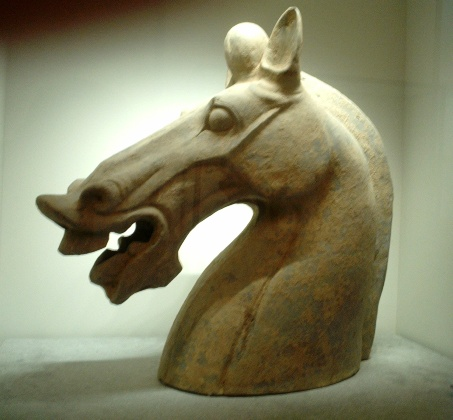
A ceramic horse head and neck (broken from the body), from the Chinese Eastern Han dynasty (1st–2nd century CE)

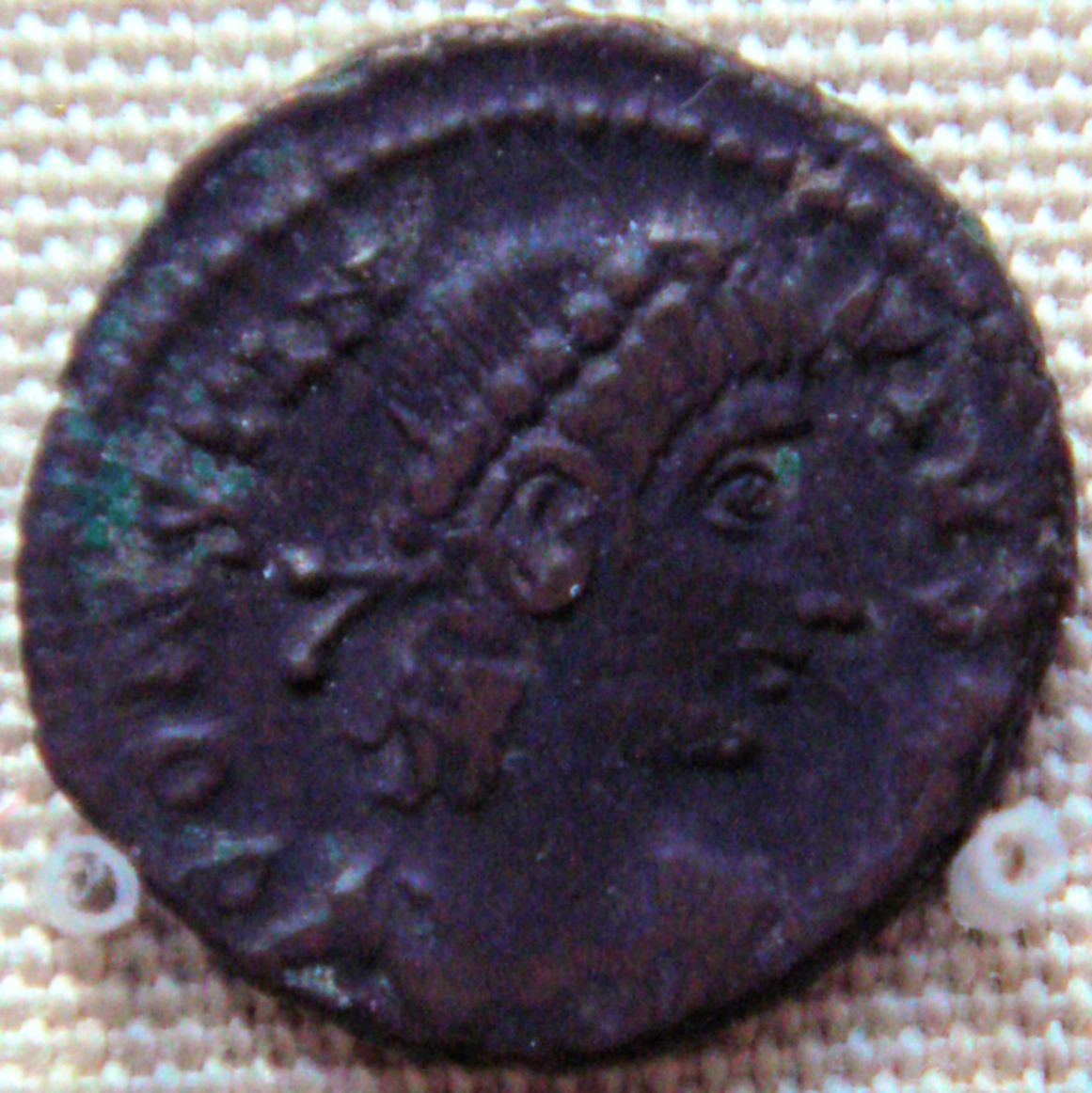
Bronze coin of Constantius II (337–361), found in Karghalik, Xinjiang, China.

The Chinese were also strongly attracted by the tall and powerful horses (named "heavenly horses") in the possession of the Dayuan (literally the "Great Ionians," the Greek kingdoms of Central Asia), which were of capital importance in fighting the nomadic Xiongnu. They defeated the Dayuan in the Han-Dayuan war. The Chinese subsequently sent numerous embassies, around ten every year, to these countries and as far as Seleucid Syria.

Thus more embassies were dispatched to Anxi [Parthia], Yancai [who later joined the Alans ], Lijian [Syria under the Greek Seleucids], Tiaozhi (Mesopotamia), and Tianzhu [northwestern India] ... As a rule, rather more than ten such missions went forward in the course of a year, and at the least five or six. (Hou Hanshu, Later Han History).

These connections marked the beginning of the Silk Road trade network that extended to the Roman Empire.

The Chinese campaigned in Central Asia on several occasions, and direct encounters between Han troops and Roman legionaries (probably captured or recruited as mercenaries by the Xiong Nu) are recorded, particularly in the 36 BCE battle of Sogdiana (Joseph Needham, Sidney Shapiro). It has been suggested that the Chinese crossbow was transmitted to the Roman world on such occasions, although the Greek gastraphetes provides an alternative origin. R. Ernest Dupuy and Trevor N. Dupuy suggest that in 36 BCE,

[A] Han expedition into Central Asia, west of Jaxartes River, apparently encountered and defeated a contingent of Roman legionaries. The Romans may have been part of Antony's army invading Parthia. Sogdiana (modern Bukhara), east of the Oxus River, on the Polytimetus River, was apparently the most easterly penetration ever made by Roman forces in Asia. The margin of Chinese victory appears to have been their crossbows, whose bolts and darts seem easily to have penetrated Roman shields and armour.

The Han dynasty army regularly policed the trade route against nomadic bandit forces generally identified as Xiongnu. Han general Ban Chao led an army of 70,000 mounted infantry and light cavalry troops in the 1st century CE to secure the trade routes, reaching far west to the Tarim Basin. Ban Chao expanded his conquests across the Pamirs to the shores of the Caspian Sea and the borders of Parthia. It was from here that the Han general dispatched envoy Gan Ying to Daqin (Rome). The Silk Road essentially came into being from the 1st century BCE, following these efforts by China to consolidate a road to the Western world and India, both through direct settlements in the area of the Tarim Basin and diplomatic relations with the countries of the Dayuan, Parthians and Bactrians further west. The Silk Roads were a "complex network of trade routes" that gave people the chance to exchange goods and culture.

A maritime Silk Route opened up between Chinese-controlled Giao Chỉ (centred in modern Vietnam, near Hanoi), probably by the 1st century. It extended, via ports on the coasts of India and Sri Lanka, all the way to Roman-controlled ports in Roman Egypt and the Nabataean territories on the northeastern coast of the Red Sea. The earliest Roman glassware bowl found in China was unearthed from a Western Han tomb in Guangzhou, dated to the early 1st century BCE, indicating that Roman commercial items were being imported through the South China Sea. According to Chinese dynastic histories, it is from this region that the Roman embassies arrived in China, beginning in 166 CE during the reigns of Marcus Aurelius and Emperor Huan of Han. Other Roman glasswares have been found in Eastern-Han-era tombs (25–220 CE) further inland in Luoyang, Nanyang, and Nanjing.

=== Roman Empire (30 BCE – 3rd century CE) ===
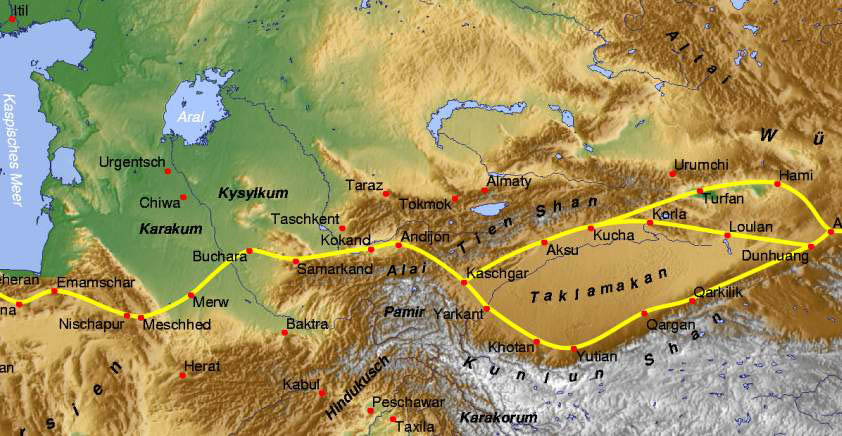
Central Asia during Roman times, with the first Silk Road

Soon after the Roman conquest of Egypt in 30 BCE, regular communications and trade between China, Southeast Asia, India, the Middle East, Africa, and Europe blossomed on an unprecedented scale. The Roman Empire inherited eastern trade routes that were part of the Silk Road from the earlier Hellenistic powers and the Arabs. With control of these trade routes, citizens of the Roman Empire received new luxuries and greater prosperity for the Empire as a whole. The Roman-style glassware discovered in the archeological sites of Gyeongju, the capital of the Silla kingdom (Korea) showed that Roman artifacts were traded as far as the Korean peninsula. The Greco-Roman trade with India started by Eudoxus of Cyzicus in 130 BCE continued to increase, and according to Strabo (II.5.12), by the time of Augustus, up to 120 ships were setting sail every year from Myos Hormos in Roman Egypt to India. The Roman Empire connected with the Central Asian Silk Road through their ports in Barygaza (present-day Bharuch) and Barbarikon (near present-day Karachi) and continued along the western coast of India. An ancient "travel guide" to this Indian Ocean trade route was the Greek Periplus of the Erythraean Sea written in 60 CE.

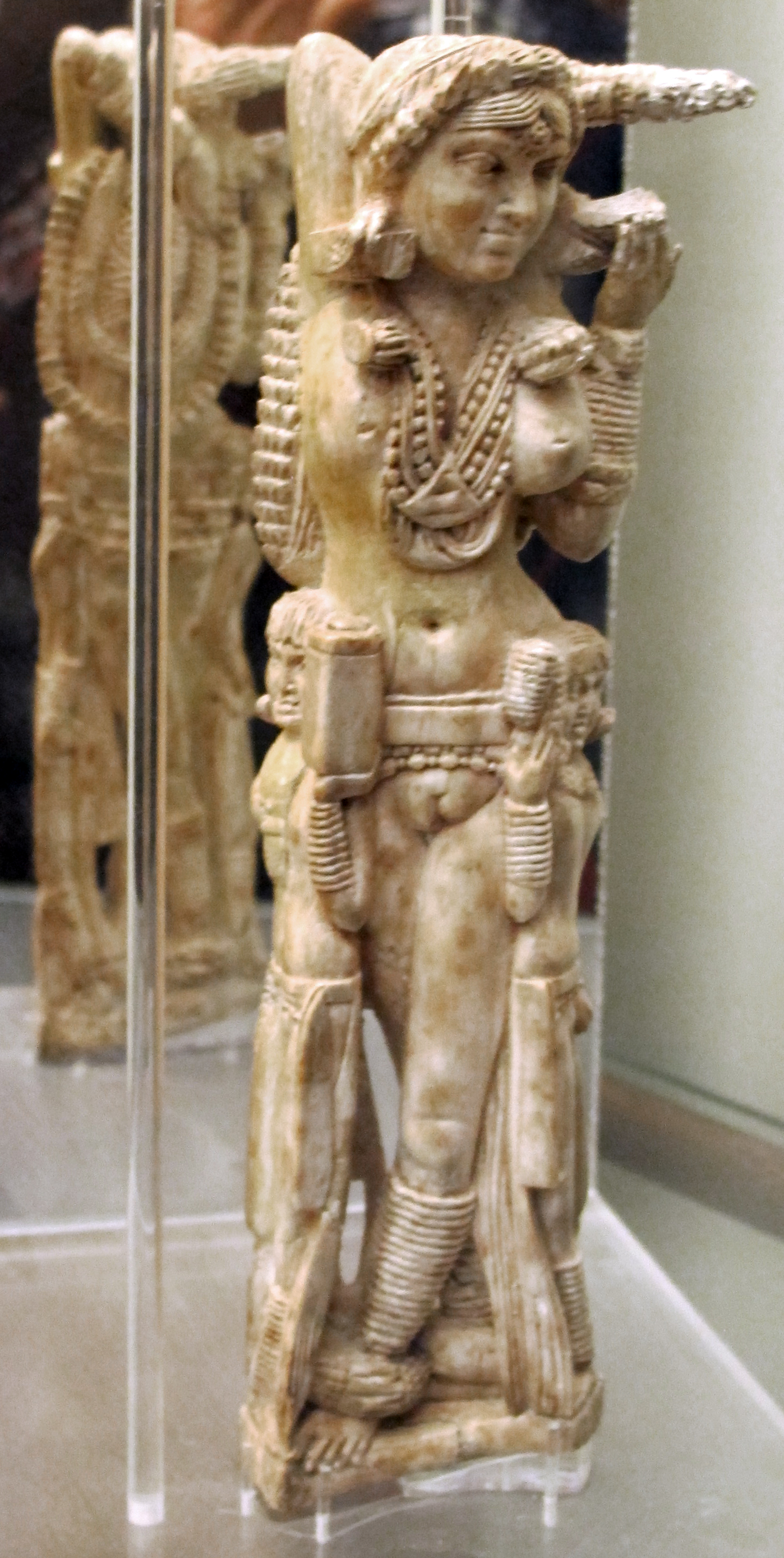
Indian art also found its way into Italy: in 1938 the Pompeii Lakshmi was found in the ruins of Pompeii (destroyed in an eruption of Mount Vesuvius in 79 CE).

The travelling party of Maës Titianus penetrated farthest east along the Silk Road from the Mediterranean world, probably with the aim of regularising contacts and reducing the role of middlemen, during one of the lulls in Rome's intermittent wars with Parthia, which repeatedly obstructed movement along the Silk Road. Intercontinental trade and communication became regular, organised, and protected by the "Great Powers." Intense trade with the Roman Empire soon followed, confirmed by the Roman craze for Chinese silk (supplied through the Parthians), even though the Romans thought silk was obtained from trees. This belief was affirmed by Seneca the Younger in his Phaedra and by Virgil in his Georgics. Notably, Pliny the Elder knew better. Speaking of the bombyx or silk moth, he wrote in his Natural Histories "They weave webs, like spiders, that become a luxurious clothing material for women, called silk." The Romans traded spices, glassware, perfumes, and silk.

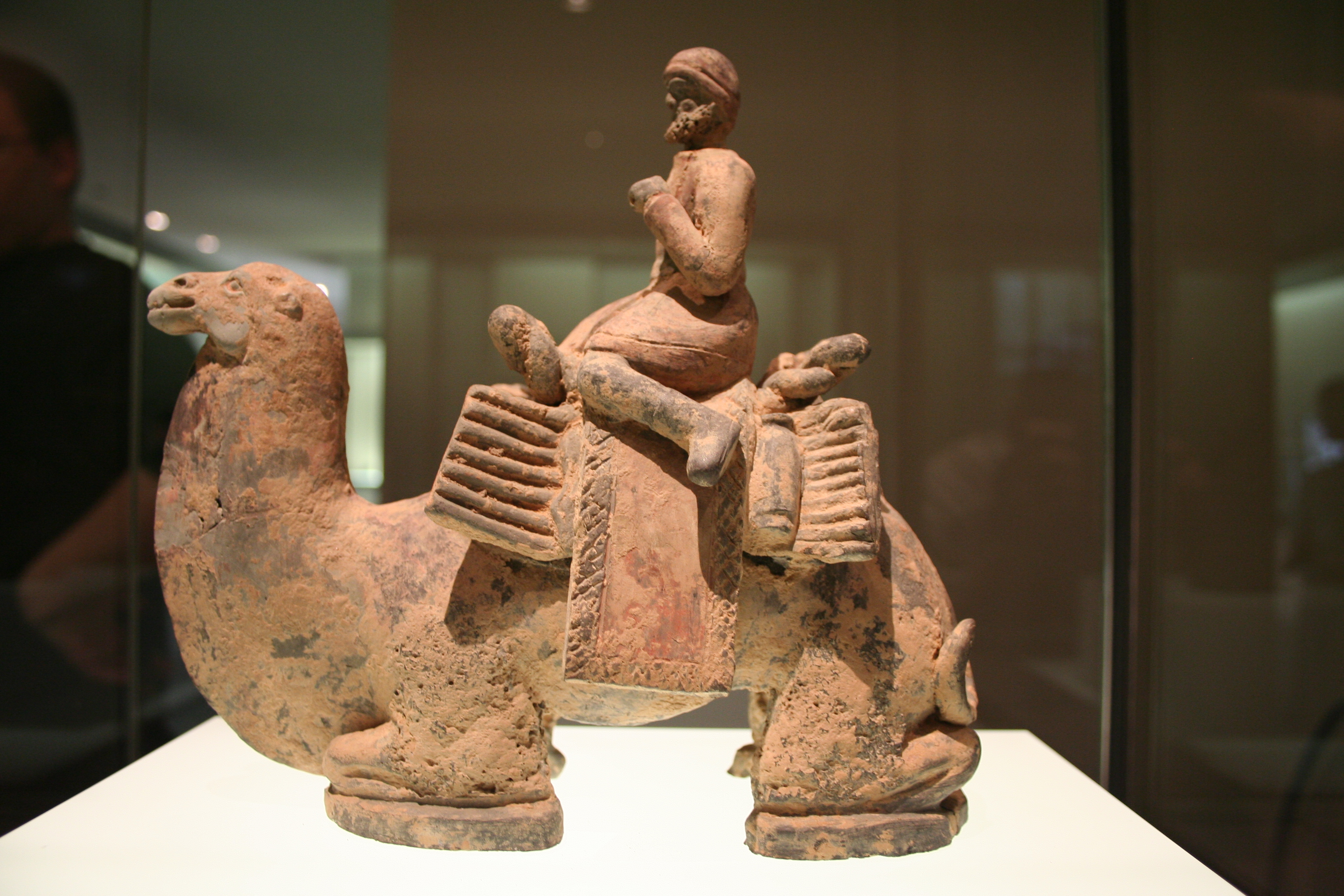
A Westerner on a camel, Northern Wei dynasty (386–534)

Roman artisans began to replace yarn with valuable plain silk cloths from China and the Silla Kingdom in Gyeongju, Korea. Chinese wealth grew as they delivered silk and other luxury goods to the Roman Empire, whose wealthy women admired their beauty. The Roman Senate issued, in vain, several edicts to prohibit the wearing of silk, on economic and moral grounds: the import of Chinese silk caused a huge outflow of gold, and silk clothes were considered decadent and immoral.

I can see clothes of silk, if materials that do not hide the body, nor even one's decency, can be called clothes. ... Wretched flocks of maids labour so that the adulteress may be visible through her thin dress, so that her husband has no more acquaintance than any outsider or foreigner with his wife's body.

The Western Roman Empire, and its demand for sophisticated Asian products, collapsed in the fifth century.

The unification of Central Asia and Northern India within the Kushan Empire between the first and third centuries reinforced the role of the powerful merchants from Bactria and Taxila. They fostered multi-cultural interaction as indicated by their 2nd century treasure hoards filled with products from the Greco-Roman world, China, and India, such as in the archeological site of Begram.

The Silk Road trade did not sell only textiles, jewels, metal and cosmetic, but also slaves, connecting the Silk Road slave trade to the Bukhara slave trade as well as the Black Sea slave trade, particularly slave girls.

=== Byzantine Empire (6th–14th centuries) ===
Map showing Byzantium along with the other major silk road powers during China's Southern dynasties period of fragmentation.

Byzantine Greek historian Procopius stated that two Nestorian Christian monks eventually uncovered the way silk was made. From this revelation, monks were sent by the Byzantine Emperor Justinian (ruled 527–565) as spies on the Silk Road from Constantinople to China and back to steal the silkworm eggs, resulting in silk production in the Mediterranean, particularly in Thrace in northern Greece, and giving the Byzantine Empire a monopoly on silk production in medieval Europe. In 568, the Byzantine ruler Justin II was greeted by a Sogdian embassy representing Istämi, ruler of the First Turkic Khaganate, who formed an alliance with the Byzantines against Khosrow I of the Sasanian Empire that allowed the Byzantines to bypass the Sasanian merchants and trade directly with the Sogdians for purchasing Chinese silk. Although the Byzantines had already procured silkworm eggs from China by this point, the quality of Chinese silk was still far greater than anything produced in the West, a fact that is perhaps emphasized by the discovery of coins minted by Justin II found in a Chinese tomb of Shanxi province dated to the Sui dynasty (581–618).

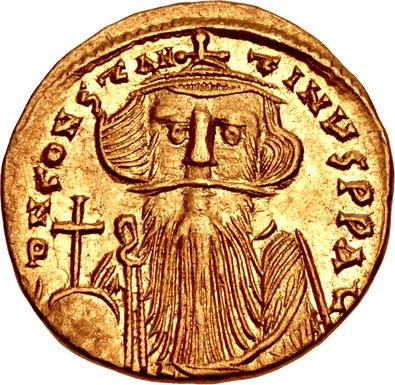
Coin of Constans II (r. 641–668), who is named in Chinese sources as the first of several Byzantine emperors to send embassies to the Chinese Tang dynasty

Both the Old Book of Tang and New Book of Tang, covering the history of the Chinese Tang dynasty (618–907), record that a new state called Fu-lin (拂菻; i.e. Byzantine Empire) was virtually identical to the previous Daqin (大秦; i.e. Roman Empire). Several Fu-lin embassies were recorded for the Tang period, starting in 643 with an alleged embassy by Constans II (transliterated as Bo duo li, 波多力, from his nickname "Kōnstantinos Pogonatos") to the court of Emperor Taizong of Tang. The History of Song describes the final embassy and its arrival in 1081, apparently sent by Michael VII Doukas (transliterated as Mie li yi ling kai sa, 滅力伊靈改撒, from his name and title Michael VII Parapinakēs Caesar) to the court of Emperor Shenzong of the Song dynasty (960–1279).

However, the History of Yuan claims that a Byzantine man became a leading astronomer and physician in Khanbaliq, at the court of Kublai Khan, Mongol founder of the Yuan dynasty (1271–1368) and was even granted the noble title 'Prince of Fu lin' (Chinese: 拂菻王; Fú lǐn wáng). The Uyghur Nestorian Christian diplomat Rabban Bar Sauma, who set out from his Chinese home in Khanbaliq (Beijing) and acted as a representative for Arghun (a grandnephew of Kublai Khan), traveled throughout Europe and attempted to secure military alliances with Edward I of England, Philip IV of France, Pope Nicholas IV, as well as the Byzantine ruler Andronikos II Palaiologos. Andronikos II had two half-sisters who were married to great-grandsons of Genghis Khan, which made him an in-law with the Yuan-dynasty Mongol ruler in Beijing, Kublai Khan.

The History of Ming preserves an account where the Hongwu Emperor, after founding the Ming dynasty (1368–1644), had a supposed Byzantine merchant named Nieh-ku-lun (捏古倫) deliver his proclamation about the establishment of a new dynasty to the Byzantine court of John V Palaiologos in September 1371. Friedrich Hirth (1885), Emil Bretschneider (1888), and more recently Edward Luttwak (2009) presumed that this was none other than Nicolaus de Bentra, a Roman Catholic bishop of Khanbilaq chosen by Pope John XXII to replace the previous archbishop John of Montecorvino.

=== Tang dynasty (7th century) ===
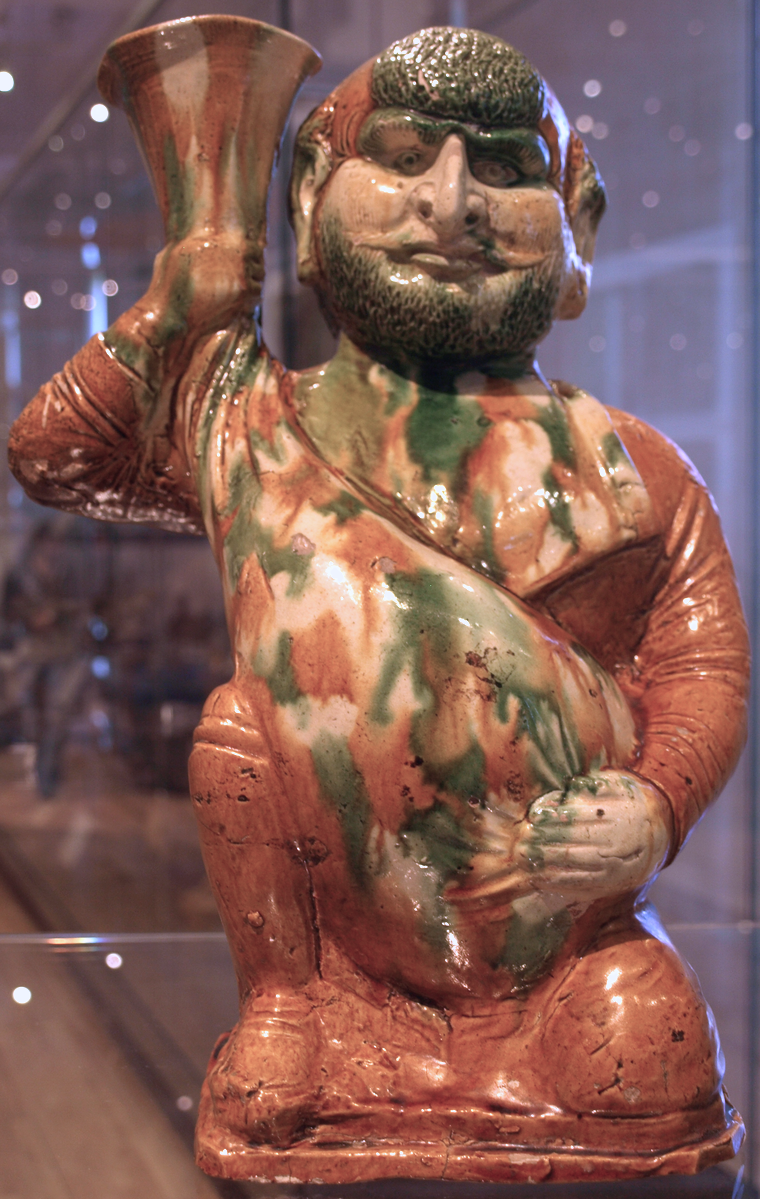
A Chinese sancai statue of a Sogdian man with a wineskin, Tang dynasty (618–907)

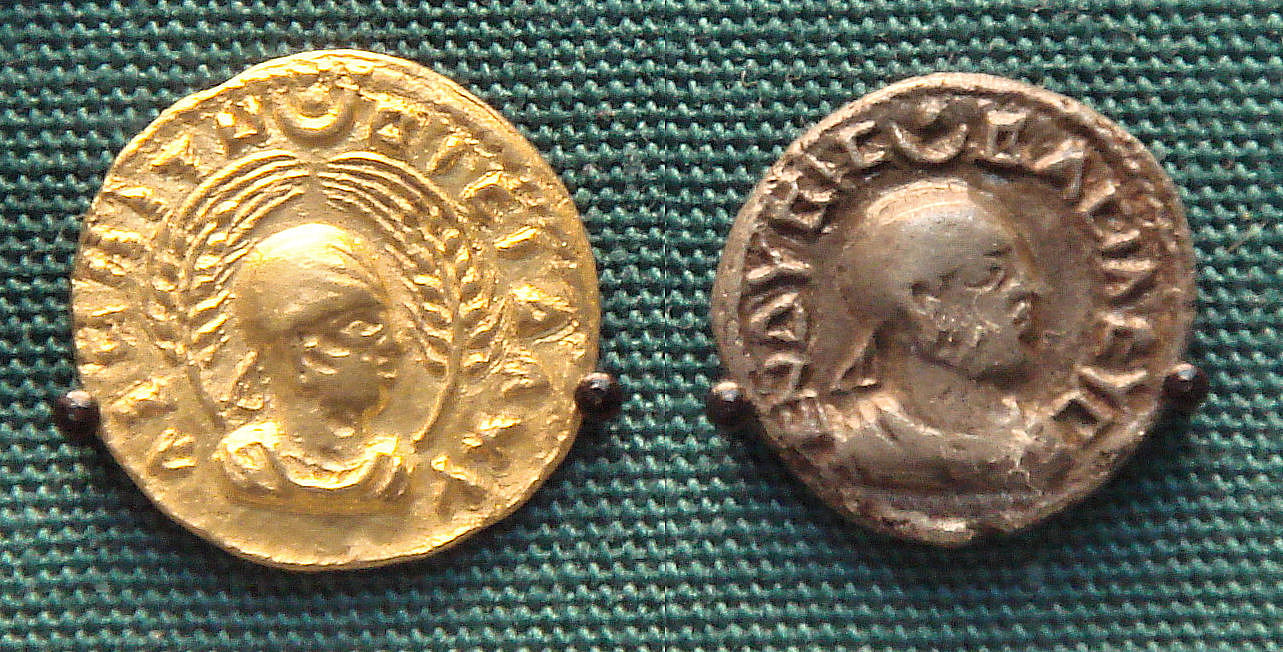
The empires and city-states of the Horn of Africa, such as the Axumites were important trading partners in the ancient Silk Road.

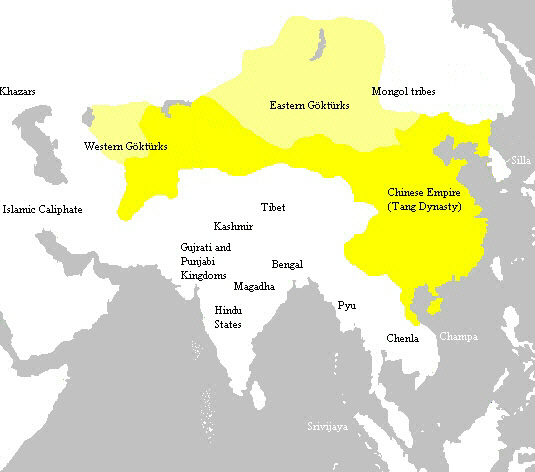
After the Tang defeated the Göktürks, they reopened the Silk Road to the west.

Although the Silk Road was initially formulated during the reign of Emperor Wu of Han (141–87 BCE), it was reopened by the Tang Empire in 639 when Hou Junji conquered the Western Regions, and remained open for almost four decades. It was closed after the Tibetans captured it in 678, but in 692, during Empress Wu's period, the Silk Road reopened when the Tang reconquered the Four Garrisons of Anxi originally installed in 640, once again connecting China directly to the West for land-based trade. The Tang captured the vital route through the Gilgit Valley from Tibet in 722, lost it to the Tibetans in 737, and regained it under the command of the Goguryeo General Gao Xianzhi.

While the Turks were settled in the Ordos region (former territory of the Xiongnu), the Tang government took on the military policy of dominating the central steppe. The Tang dynasty (along with Turkic allies) conquered and subdued Central Asia during the 640s and 650s. During Emperor Taizong's reign alone, large campaigns were launched against not only the Göktürks, but also separate campaigns against the Tuyuhun, the oasis states, and the Xueyantuo. Under Emperor Taizong, Tang general Li Jing conquered the Eastern Turkic Khaganate. Under Emperor Gaozong, Tang general Su Dingfang conquered the Western Turkic Khaganate, an important ally of the Byzantine empire. After these conquests, the Tang dynasty fully controlled the Xiyu, which was the strategic location astride the Silk Road. This led the Tang dynasty to reopen the Silk Road, with this portion named the Tang-Tubo Road ("Tang-Tibet Road") in many historical texts.

The Tang dynasty established a second Pax Sinica, and the Silk Road reached its golden age, whereby Persian and Sogdian merchants benefited from the commerce between East and West. At the same time, the Chinese empire welcomed foreign cultures, making it very cosmopolitan in its urban centres. In addition to the land route, the Tang dynasty also developed the maritime Silk Route. Chinese envoys had been sailing through the Indian Ocean to India since perhaps the 2nd century BCE, yet, it was during the Tang dynasty that a strong Chinese maritime presence could be found in the Persian Gulf and Red Sea into Persia, Mesopotamia (sailing up the Euphrates River in modern-day Iraq), Arabia, Egypt, Aksum (Ethiopia), and Somalia in the Horn of Africa.

=== Sogdian–Türkic tribes (4th–8th centuries) ===
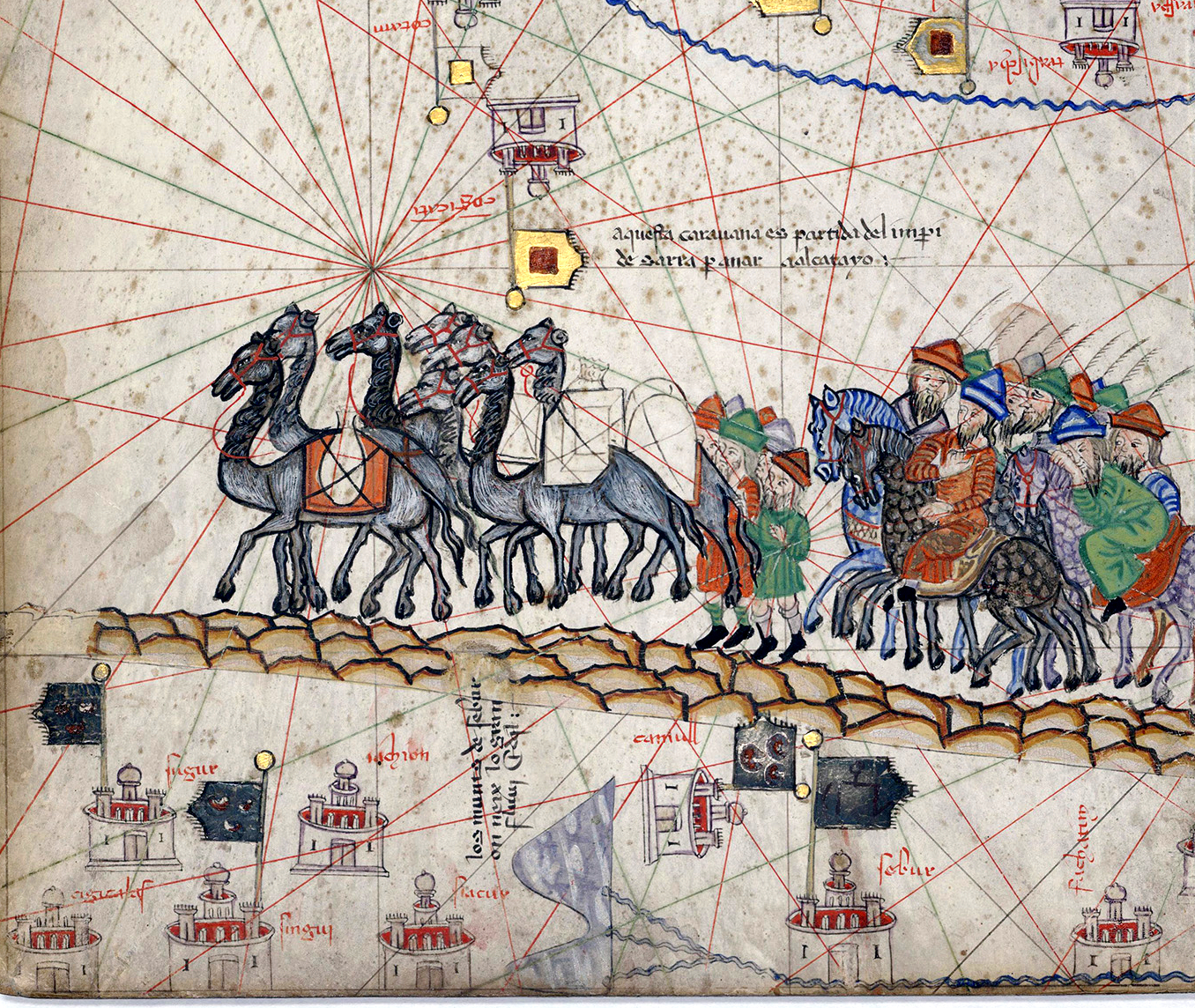
Marco Polo's caravan on the Silk Road, from the Catalan Atlas, 1375

The Silk Road represents an early phenomenon of political and cultural integration due to inter-regional trade. In its heyday, it sustained an international culture that strung together groups as diverse as the Magyars, Armenians, and Chinese. The Silk Road reached its peak in the west during the time of the Byzantine Empire; in the Nile-Oxus section, from the Sassanid Empire period to the Il Khanate period; and in the sinitic zone from the Three Kingdoms period to the Yuan dynasty period. Trade between East and West also developed across the Indian Ocean, between Alexandria in Egypt and Guangzhou in China. Persian Sassanid coins emerged as a means of currency, just as valuable as silk yarn and textiles.

Under its strong integrating dynamics on the one hand and the impacts of change it transmitted on the other, tribal societies previously living in isolation along the Silk Road, and pastoralists who were of barbarian cultural development, were drawn to the riches and opportunities of the civilisations connected by the routes, taking on the trades of marauders or mercenaries. "Many barbarian tribes became skilled warriors able to conquer rich cities and fertile lands and to forge strong military empires."

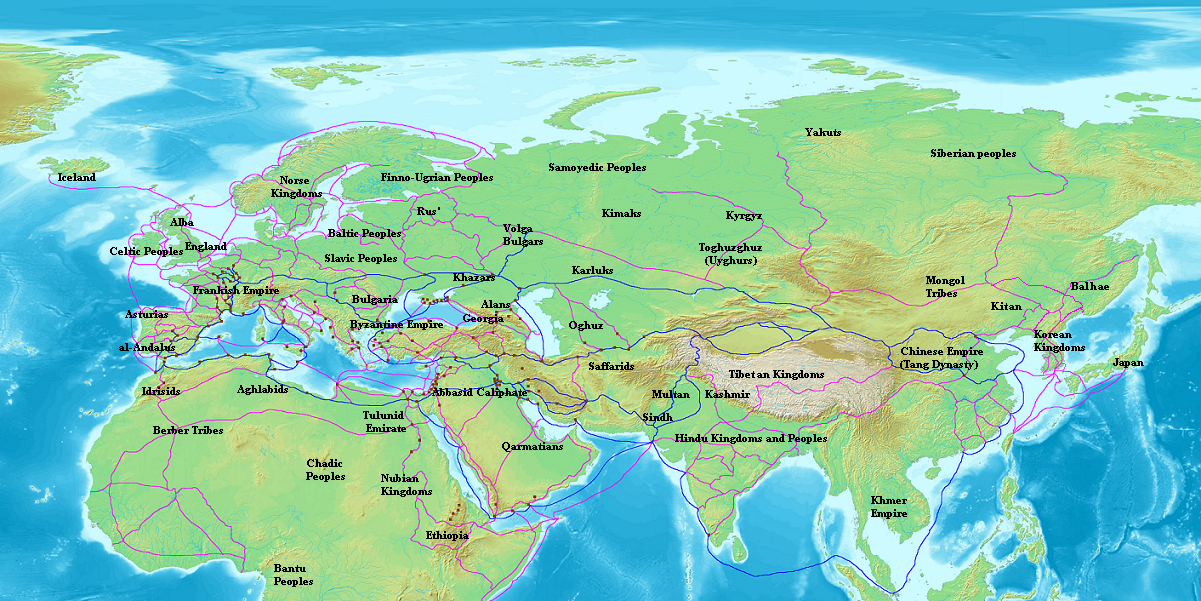
Map of Eurasia and Africa showing trade networks, c. 870

The Sogdians dominated the east–west trade after the 4th century up to the 8th century. They were the main caravan merchants of Central Asia. A. V. Dybo noted that "according to historians, the main driving force of the Great Silk Road were not just Sogdians, but the carriers of a mixed Sogdian-Türkic culture that often came from mixed families."

The Silk Road gave rise to the clusters of military states of nomadic origins in North China, ushered the Nestorian, Manichaean, Buddhist, and later Islamic religions into Central Asia and China.

=== Islamic era (8th–13th centuries) ===
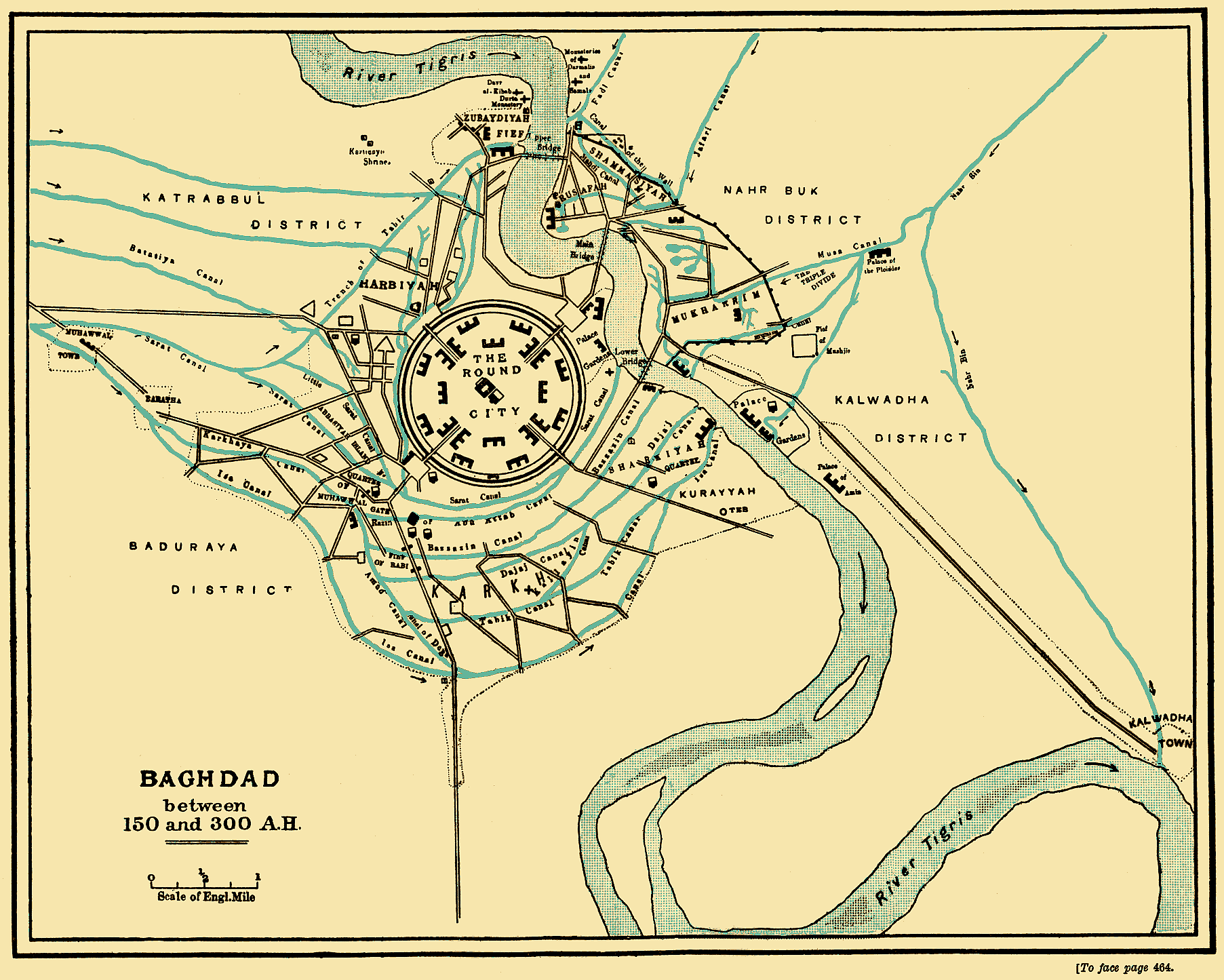
The Round city of Baghdad between 767 and 912 was the most important urban node along the Silk Road.

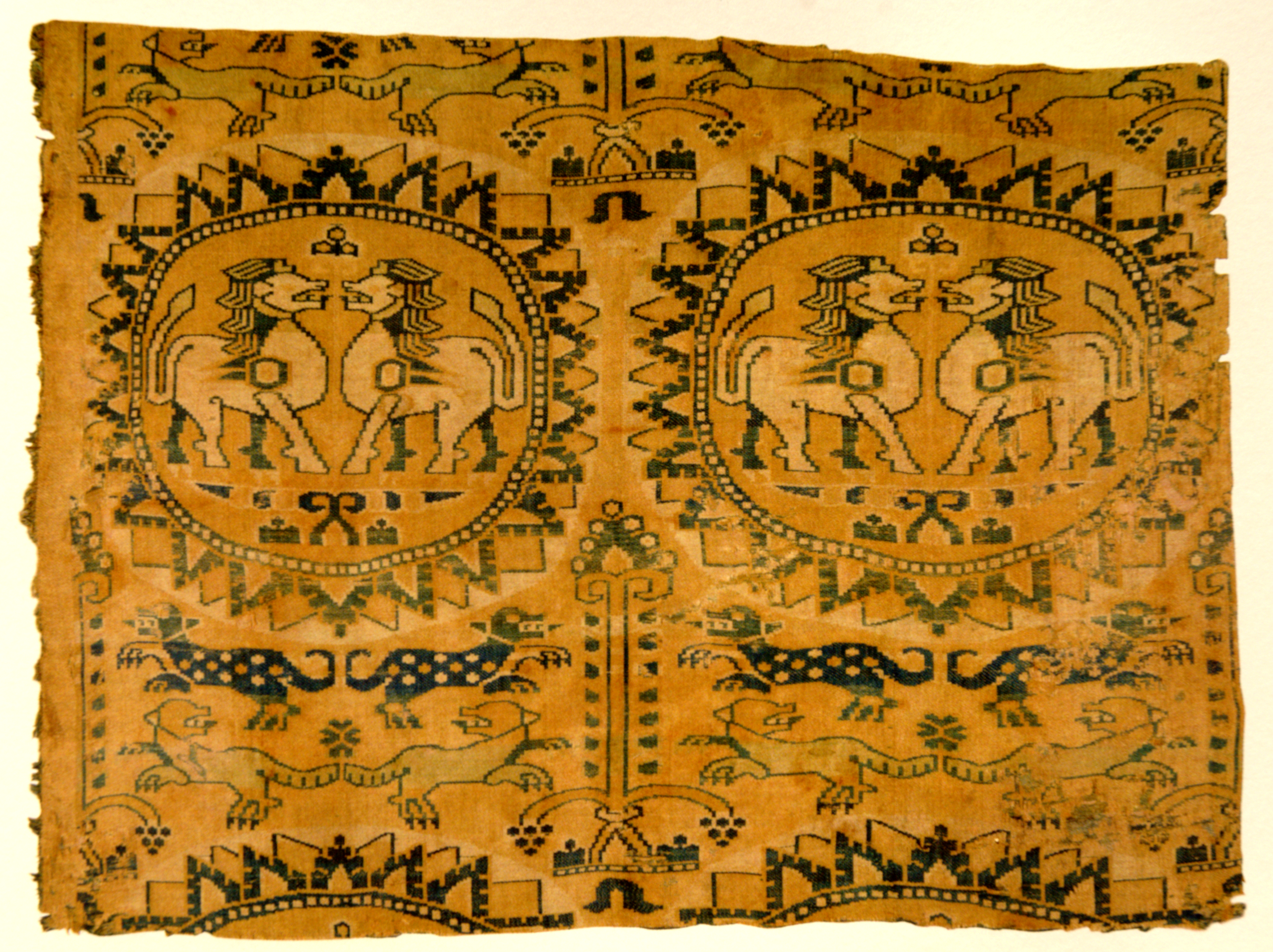
A lion motif on Sogdian polychrome silk, 8th century, most likely from Bukhara

By the Umayyad era, Damascus had overtaken Ctesiphon as a major trade center until the Abbasid dynasty built the city of Baghdad, which became the most important city along the silk road.

At the end of its glory, the routes brought about the largest continental empire ever, the Mongol Empire, with its political centres strung along the Silk Road (Beijing) in North China, Karakorum in central Mongolia, Samarkand in Transoxiana, Tabriz in Northern Iran, realising the political unification of zones previously loosely and intermittently connected by material and cultural goods.

The Islamic world expanded into Central Asia during the 8th century, under the Umayyad Caliphate, while its successor the Abbasid Caliphate put a halt to Chinese westward expansion at the Battle of Talas in 751 (near the Talas River in modern-day Kyrgyzstan). However, following the disastrous An Lushan Rebellion (755–763) and the conquest of the Western Regions by the Tibetan Empire, the Tang Empire was unable to reassert its control over Central Asia. Contemporary Tang authors noted how the dynasty had gone into decline after this point. In 848 the Tang Chinese, led by the commander Zhang Yichao, were only able to reclaim the Hexi Corridor and Dunhuang in Gansu from the Tibetans. The Persian Samanid Empire (819–999) centered in Bukhara (Uzbekistan) continued the trade legacy of the Sogdians. The disruptions of trade were curtailed in that part of the world by the end of the 10th century and conquests of Central Asia by the Turkic Islamic Kara-Khanid Khanate, yet Nestorian Christianity, Zoroastrianism, Manichaeism, and Buddhism in Central Asia virtually disappeared.

During the early 13th century, Khwarazm was invaded by the Mongol Empire. The Mongol ruler Genghis Khan had the once vibrant cities of Bukhara and Samarkand burned to the ground after besieging them. However, in 1370 Samarkand saw a revival as the capital of the new Timurid Empire. The Turko-Mongol ruler Timur forcefully moved artisans and intellectuals from across Asia to Samarkand, making it one of the most important trade centers and cultural entrepôts of the Islamic world.

=== Mongol Empire (13th–14th centuries) ===
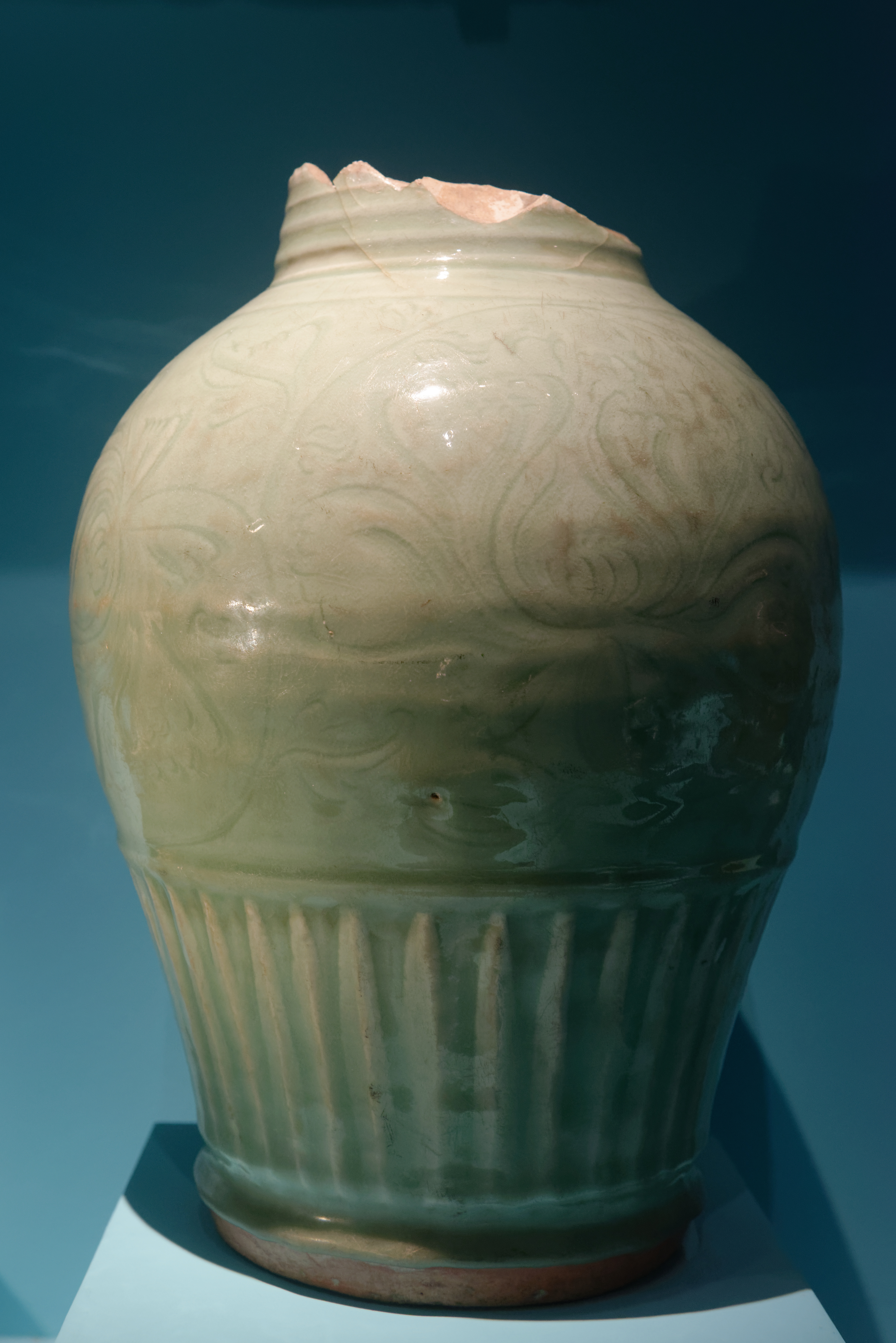
Yuan dynasty era celadon vase from Mogadishu.

The Mongol expansion throughout the Asian continent from around 1207 to 1360 helped bring political stability and re-established the Silk Road (via Karakorum and Khanbaliq). It also brought an end to the dominance of the Islamic Caliphate over world trade. Because the Mongols came to control the trade routes, trade circulated throughout the region, though they never abandoned their nomadic lifestyle.

The Mongol rulers wanted to establish their capital on the Central Asian steppe, so to accomplish this goal, after every conquest they enlisted local people (traders, scholars, artisans) to help them construct and manage their empire. The Mongols developed overland and maritime routes throughout the Eurasian continent, Black Sea and the Mediterranean in the west, and the Indian Ocean in the south. In the second half of the thirteenth century Mongol-sponsored business partnerships flourished in the Indian Ocean connecting Mongol Middle East and Mongol China

The Mongol diplomat Rabban Bar Sauma visited the courts of Europe in 1287–88 and provided a detailed written report to the Mongols. Around the same time, the Venetian explorer Marco Polo became one of the first Europeans to travel the Silk Road to China. His tales, documented in The Travels of Marco Polo, opened Western eyes to some of the customs of the Far East. He was not the first to bring back stories, but he was one of the most widely read. He had been preceded by numerous Christian missionaries to the East, such as William of Rubruck, Benedykt Polak, Giovanni da Pian del Carpine, and Andrew of Longjumeau. Later envoys included Odoric of Pordenone, Giovanni de' Marignolli, John of Montecorvino, Niccolò de' Conti, and Ibn Battuta, a Moroccan Muslim traveller who passed through the present-day Middle East and across the Silk Road from Tabriz between 1325 and 1354. Some Europeans were also living in China for longer periods around this time. Tombstones of the siblings Caterina and Antonio Vilioni, who died in 1342 and 1344, respectively, were unearthed in the twentieth century in Yangzhou.

In the 13th century, efforts were made at forming a Franco-Mongol alliance, with an exchange of ambassadors and (failed) attempts at military collaboration in the Holy Land during the later Crusades. Eventually, the Mongols in the Ilkhanate, after they had destroyed the Abbasid and Ayyubid dynasties, converted to Islam and signed the 1323 Treaty of Aleppo with the surviving Muslim power, the Egyptian Mamluks.

Some studies indicate that the Black Death, which devastated Europe starting in the late 1340s, may have reached Europe from Central Asia (or China) along the trade routes of the Mongol Empire. One theory holds that Genoese traders coming from the entrepôt of Trebizond in northern Turkey carried the disease to Western Europe; like many other outbreaks of plague, there is strong evidence that it originated in marmots in Central Asia and was carried westwards to the Black Sea by Silk Road traders.

=== Decline (15th century–present) ===
The fragmentation of the Mongol Empire loosened the political, cultural, and economic unity of the Silk Road. Turkmeni marching lords seized land around the western part of the Silk Road from the decaying Byzantine Empire. After the fall of the Mongol Empire, the great political powers along the Silk Road became economically and culturally separated. Accompanying the crystallisation of regional states was the decline of nomad power, partly due to the devastation of the Black Death and partly due to the encroachment of sedentary civilisations equipped with gunpowder.

Significant is Armenians' role in making Europe–Asia trade possible by being located in the crossing roads between these two. Armenia had a monopoly on almost all trade roads in this area and a colossal network. From 1700 to 1765, the total export of Persian silk was entirely conducted by Armenians. They were also exporting raisins, coffee beans, figs, Turkish yarn, camel hair, various precious stones, rice, etc., from Turkey and Iran.

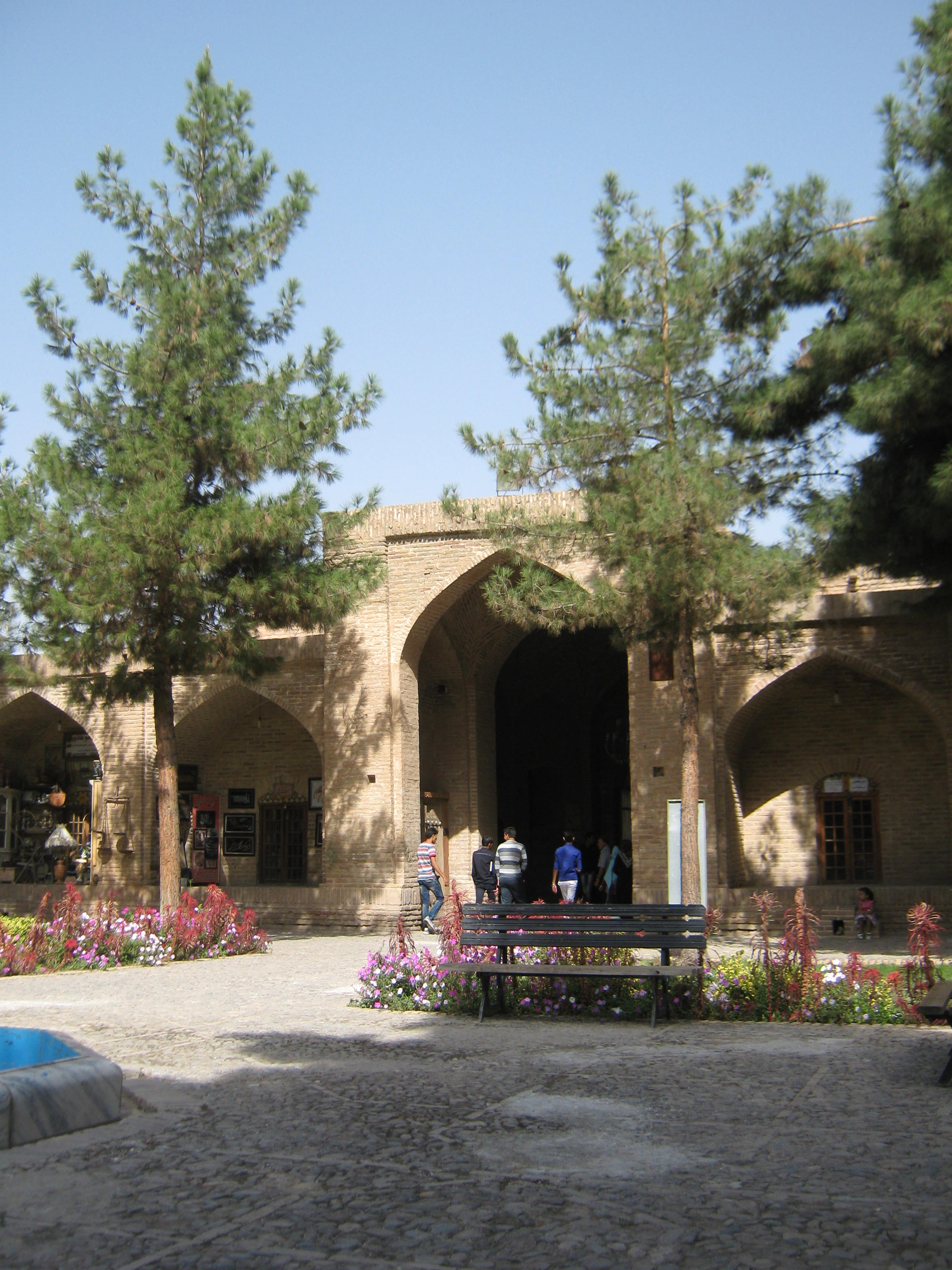
One of many remaining Safavid Empire Caravanserais in Iran. This particular caravanserai is located in the city of Nishapur which was one of the central Silk Road cities of Greater Khorasan.

The silk trade continued to flourish until it was disrupted by the collapse of the Safavid Empire in the 1720s.

== Expansion of religions ==
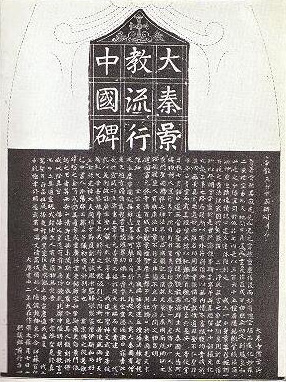
The Nestorian Stele, created in 781, describes the introduction of Nestorian Christianity to China

Richard Foltz, Xinru Liu, and others have described how trading activities along the Silk Road over many centuries facilitated the transmission not just of goods but also ideas and culture, notably in the area of religions. Zoroastrianism, Judaism, Buddhism, Christianity, Manichaeism, and Islam all spread across Eurasia through trade networks that were tied to specific religious communities and their institutions. Notably, established Buddhist monasteries along the Silk Road offered a haven, as well as a new religion for foreigners.

The spread of religions and cultural traditions along the Silk Roads, according to Jerry H. Bentley, also led to syncretism. One example was the encounter with the Chinese and Xiongnu nomads. These unlikely events of cross-cultural contact allowed both cultures to adapt to each other as an alternative. The Xiongnu adopted Chinese agricultural techniques, dress style, and lifestyle, while the Chinese adopted Xiongnu military techniques, some dress style, music, and dance. Perhaps most surprising of the cultural exchanges between China and the Xiongnu, Chinese soldiers sometimes defected and converted to the Xiongnu way of life, and stayed in the steppes for fear of punishment.

Nomadic mobility played a key role in facilitating inter-regional contacts and cultural exchanges along the ancient Silk Roads.

=== Transmission of Christianity ===
The transmission of Christianity was primarily known as Nestorianism on the Silk Road. In 781, an inscribed stele shows Nestorian Christian missionaries arriving on the Silk Road. Christianity had spread both east and west, simultaneously bringing Syriac language and evolving the forms of worship.

=== Transmission of Buddhism ===
The Silk Road transmission of Buddhism: Mahayana Buddhism first entered the Chinese Empire (Han dynasty) during the Kushan era. The overland and maritime "Silk Roads" were interlinked and complementary, forming what scholars have called the "great circle of Buddhism."

The transmission of Buddhism to China via the Silk Road began in the 1st century CE, according to a semi-legendary account of an ambassador sent to the West by the Chinese Emperor Ming (58–75). During this period Buddhism began to spread throughout Southeast, East, and Central Asia. Mahayana, Theravada, and Vajrayana are the three primary forms of Buddhism that spread across Asia via the Silk Road.

The Buddhist movement was the first large-scale missionary movement in the history of world religions. Chinese missionaries were able to assimilate Buddhism, to an extent, to native Chinese Daoists, which brought the two beliefs together. Buddha's community of followers, the Sangha, consisted of male and female monks and laity. These people moved through India and beyond to spread the ideas of Buddha. As the number of members within the Sangha increased, it became costly so that only the larger cities were able to afford having the Buddha and his disciples visit. It is believed that under the control of the Kushans, Buddhism was spread to China and other parts of Asia from the middle of the first century to the middle of the third century. Extensive contacts started in the 2nd century, probably as a consequence of the expansion of the Kushan empire into the Chinese territory of the Tarim Basin, due to the missionary efforts of a great number of Buddhist monks to Chinese lands. The first missionaries and translators of Buddhist scriptures into Chinese were either Parthian, Kushan, Sogdian, or Kuchean.

One result of the spread of Buddhism along the Silk Road was displacement and conflict. The Greek Seleucids were exiled to Iran and Central Asia because of a new Iranian dynasty called the Parthians at the beginning of the 2nd century BCE, and as a result, the Parthians became the new middlemen for trade in a period when the Romans were major customers for silk. Parthian scholars were involved in one of the first-ever Buddhist text translations into the Chinese language. Its main trade centre on the Silk Road, the city of Merv, in due course and with the coming of age of Buddhism in China, became a major Buddhist centre by the middle of the 2nd century. Knowledge among people on the silk roads also increased when Emperor Ashoka of the Maurya dynasty (268–232 BCE) converted to Buddhism and raised the religion to official status in his northern Indian empire.

From the 4th century CE onward, Chinese pilgrims also started to travel on the Silk Road to India to get improved access to the original Buddhist scriptures, with Fa-hsien's pilgrimage to India (395–414), and later Xuanzang (629–644) and Hyecho, who traveled from Korea to India. The travels of the priest Xuanzang were fictionalized in the 16th century in a fantasy adventure novel called Journey to the West, which told of trials with demons and the aid given by various disciples on the journey.

There were many different schools of Buddhism travelling on the Silk Road. The Dharmaguptakas and the Sarvastivadins were two of the major Nikaya schools. These were both eventually displaced by the Mahayana, also known as "Great Vehicle." This movement of Buddhism first gained influence in the Khotan region. The Mahayana, which was more of a "pan-Buddhist movement" than a school of Buddhism, appears to have begun in northwestern India or Central Asia. It formed during the 1st century BCE and was small at first, and the origins of this "Greater Vehicle" are not fully clear. Some Mahayana scripts were found in northern Pakistan, but the main texts are still believed to have been composed in Central Asia along the Silk Road. These different schools and movements of Buddhism were a result of the diverse and complex influences and beliefs on the Silk Road. With the rise of Mahayana Buddhism, the initial direction of Buddhist development changed. This form of Buddhism highlighted, as stated by Xinru Liu, "the elusiveness of physical reality, including material wealth". It also stressed getting rid of material desire to a certain point; this was often difficult for followers to understand.

During the 5th and 6th centuries CE, merchants played a large role in the spread of religion, in particular Buddhism. Merchants found the moral and ethical teachings of Buddhism an appealing alternative to previous religions. As a result, merchants supported Buddhist monasteries along the Silk Road, and in return, the Buddhists gave the merchants somewhere to stay as they traveled from city to city. As a result, merchants spread Buddhism to foreign encounters as they traveled. Merchants also helped to establish diaspora within the communities they encountered, and over time their cultures became based on Buddhism. As a result, these communities became centers of literacy and culture with well-organized marketplaces, lodging, and storage. The voluntary conversion of Chinese ruling elites helped the spread of Buddhism in East Asia and led Buddhism to become widespread in Chinese society. The Silk Road transmission of Buddhism essentially ended around the 7th century with the rise of Islam in Central Asia.

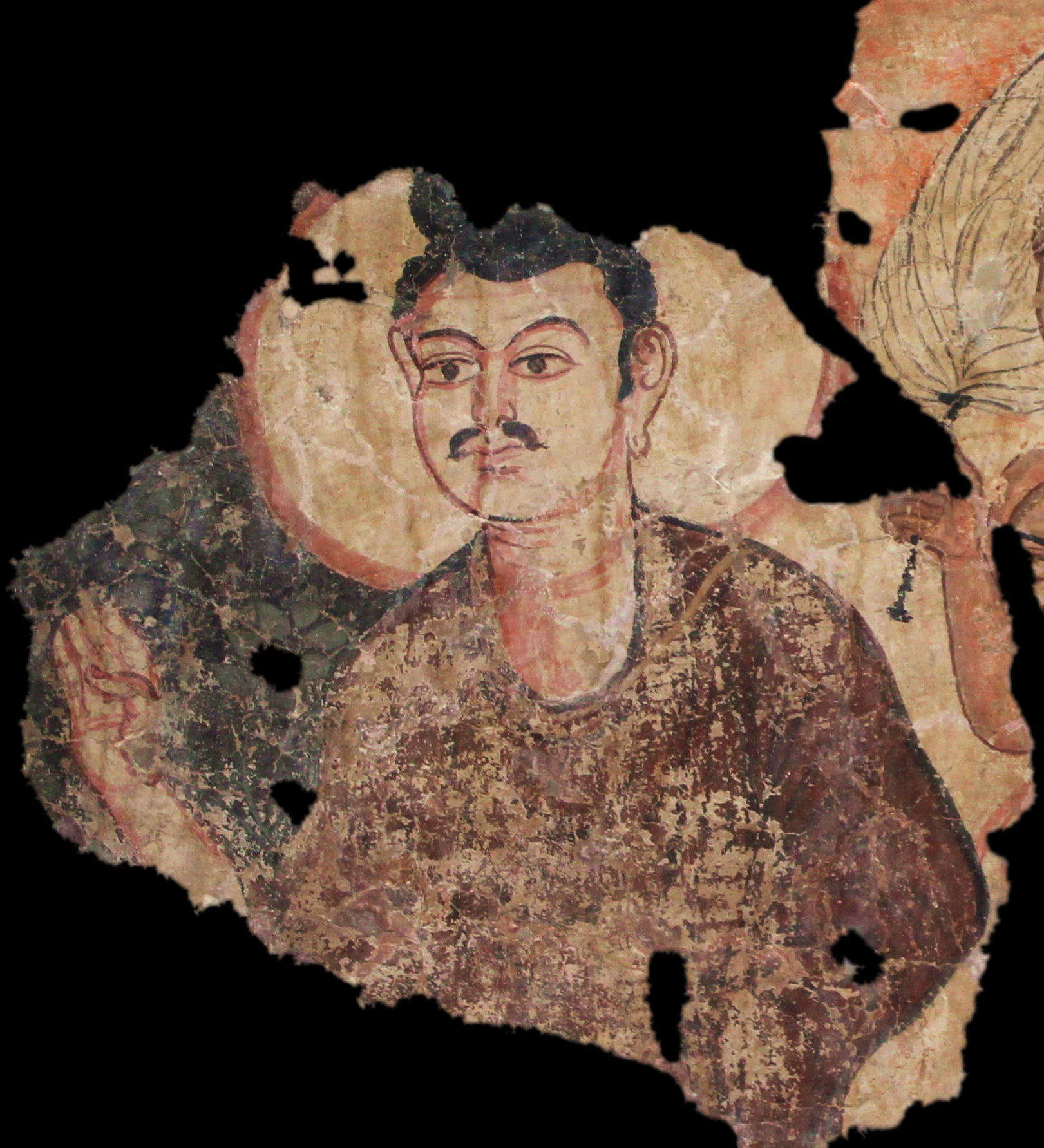
Fragment of a wall painting depicting Buddha from a stupa in Miran along the Silk Road (200–400 CE)

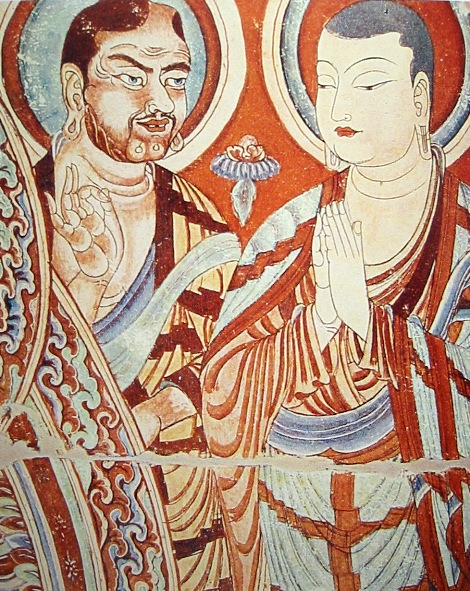
A blue-eyed Central Asian monk teaching an East-Asian monk, Bezeklik, Turfan, eastern Tarim Basin, China, 9th century; the monk on the left is possibly Tocharian, although more likely Sogdian.

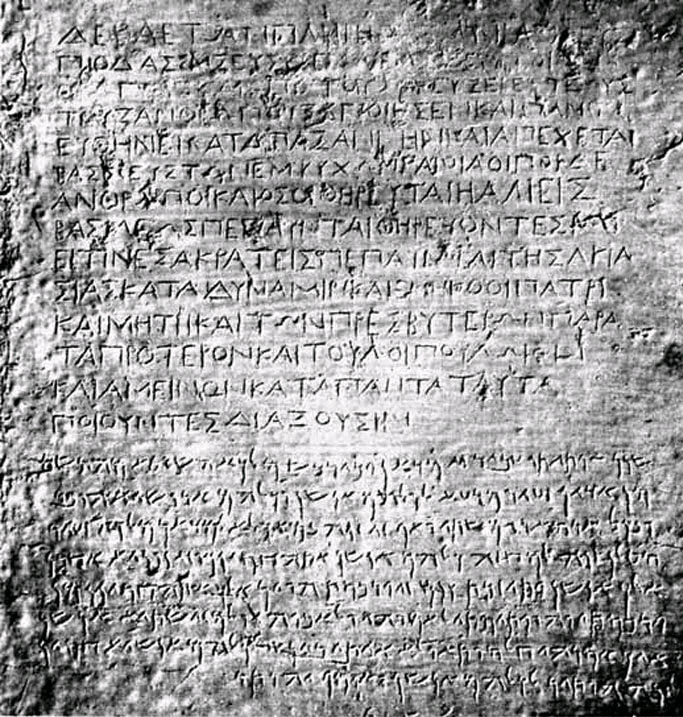
Bilingual edict (Greek and Aramaic) by Indian Buddhist King Ashoka, 3rd century BCE; see Edicts of Ashoka, from Kandahar. This edict advocates the adoption of "godliness" using the Greek term Eusebeia for Dharma. Kabul Museum.

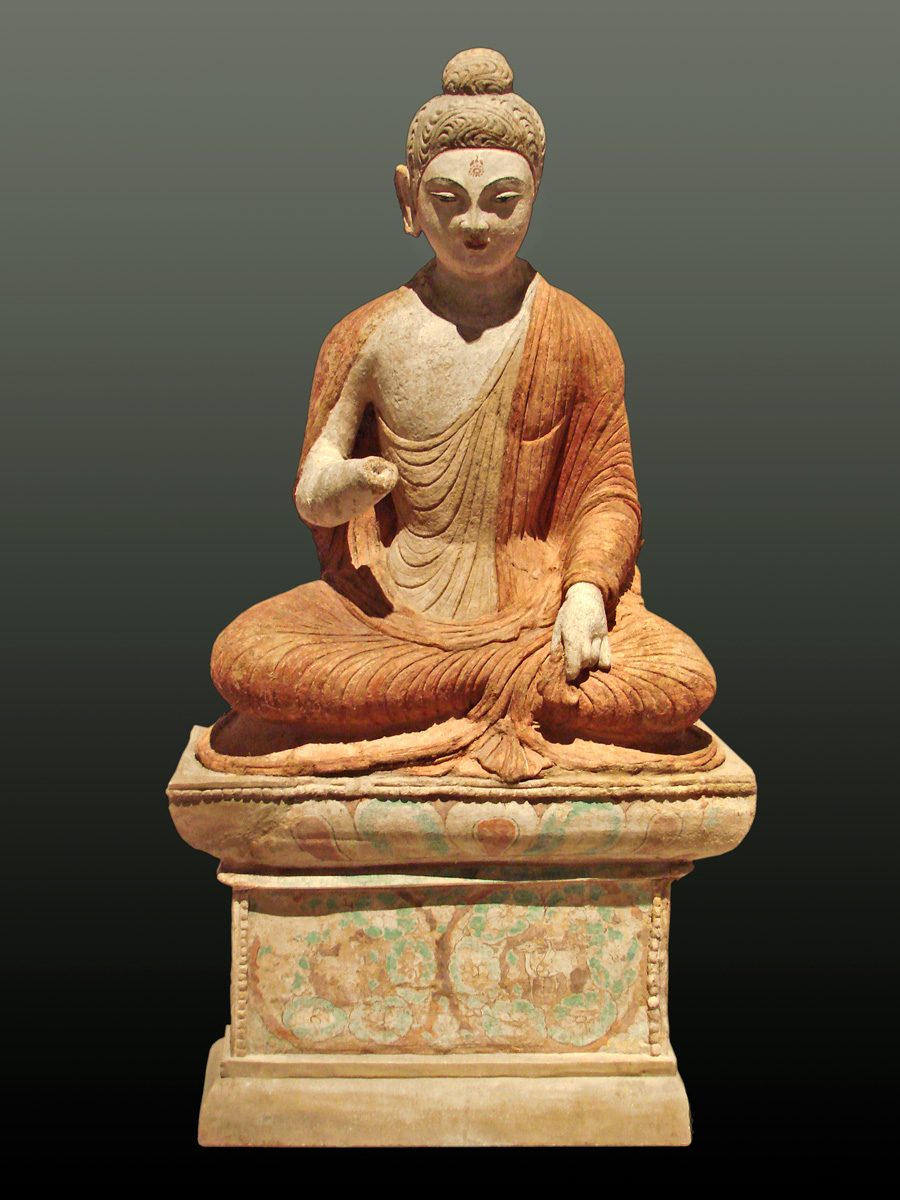
A statue depicting Buddha giving a sermon, from Sarnath, 3,000 km (1,864 mi) southwest of Urumqi, Xinjiang, 8th century

=== Judaism on the Silk Road ===
Adherents to the Jewish faith first began to travel eastward from Mesopotamia following the Persian conquest of Babylon in 539 BCE by the armies of Cyrus the Great. Judean slaves freed after the Persian conquest of Babylon dispersed throughout the Persian Empire. Some Judeans could have traveled as far east as Bactria and Sogdia, though there is no clear evidence for this early settlement of Judeans. After settlement, it is likely that most Judeans took up trades in commerce. Trading along the silk trade networks by Judean merchants increased as the trade networks expanded. By the classical age, when trade goods traveled from as far east as China to as far west as Rome, Judean merchants in Central Asia would have been in an advantageous position to participate in trade along the Silk Road. A group of Judean merchants originating from Gaul known as the Radanites were one group of Judean merchants that had thriving trade networks from China to Rome. This trade was facilitated by a positive relationship the Radanites were able to foster with the Khazar Turks. The Khazar Turks served as a good spot in between China and Rome, and the Khazar Turks saw a relationship with the Radanites as a good commercial opportunity.

According to Richard Foltz "there is more evidence for Iranian influence on the formation of Jewish [religious] ideas than the reverse." Concepts of a paradise (heaven) for the good and a place of suffering (hell) for the wicked, and a form of world-ending apocalypse came from Iranian religious ideas, and this is supported by a lack of such ideas from pre-exile Judean sources. The origin of the devil is also said to come from the Iranian Angra Mainyu, an evil figure in Persian mythology.

== Expansion of the arts ==
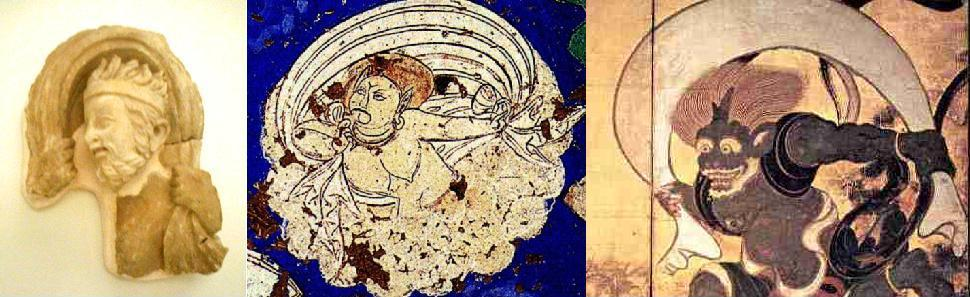
Iconographical evolution of the Wind God. Left: Greek Wind God from Hadda, 2nd century. Middle: Wind God from Kizil, Tarim Basin, 7th century. Right: Japanese Wind God Fujin, 17th century.

Many artistic influences were transmitted via the Silk Road, particularly through Central Asia, where Hellenistic, Iranian, Indian and Chinese influences could intermix. Greco-Buddhist art represents one of the most vivid examples of this interaction. Silk was also a representation of art, serving as a religious symbol. Most importantly, silk was used as currency for trade along the silk road.

These artistic influences can be seen in the development of Buddhism where, for instance, Buddha was first depicted as human in the Kushan period. Many scholars have attributed this to Greek influence. The mixture of Greek and Indian elements can be found in later Buddhist art in China and throughout countries on the Silk Road.

The production of art consisted of many different items that were traded along the Silk Roads from the East to the West. One common product, the lapis lazuli, was a blue stone with golden specks, which was used as paint after it was ground into powder.

== Commemoration ==
On 22 June 2014, the United Nations Educational, Scientific and Cultural Organization (UNESCO) named the Silk Road a World Heritage Site at the 2014 Conference on World Heritage. The United Nations World Tourism Organization has been working since 1993 to develop sustainable international tourism along the route with the stated goal of fostering peace and understanding.

To commemorate the Silk Road becoming a UNESCO World Heritage Site, the China National Silk Museum announced a "Silk Road Week" to take place 19–25 June 2020. Bishkek and Almaty each have a major east–west street named after the Silk Road (Kyrgyz: Жибек жолу, Jibek Jolu in Bishkek, and Kazakh: Жібек жолы, Jibek Joly in Almaty).

== Gallery ==
Silk Road and artifacts

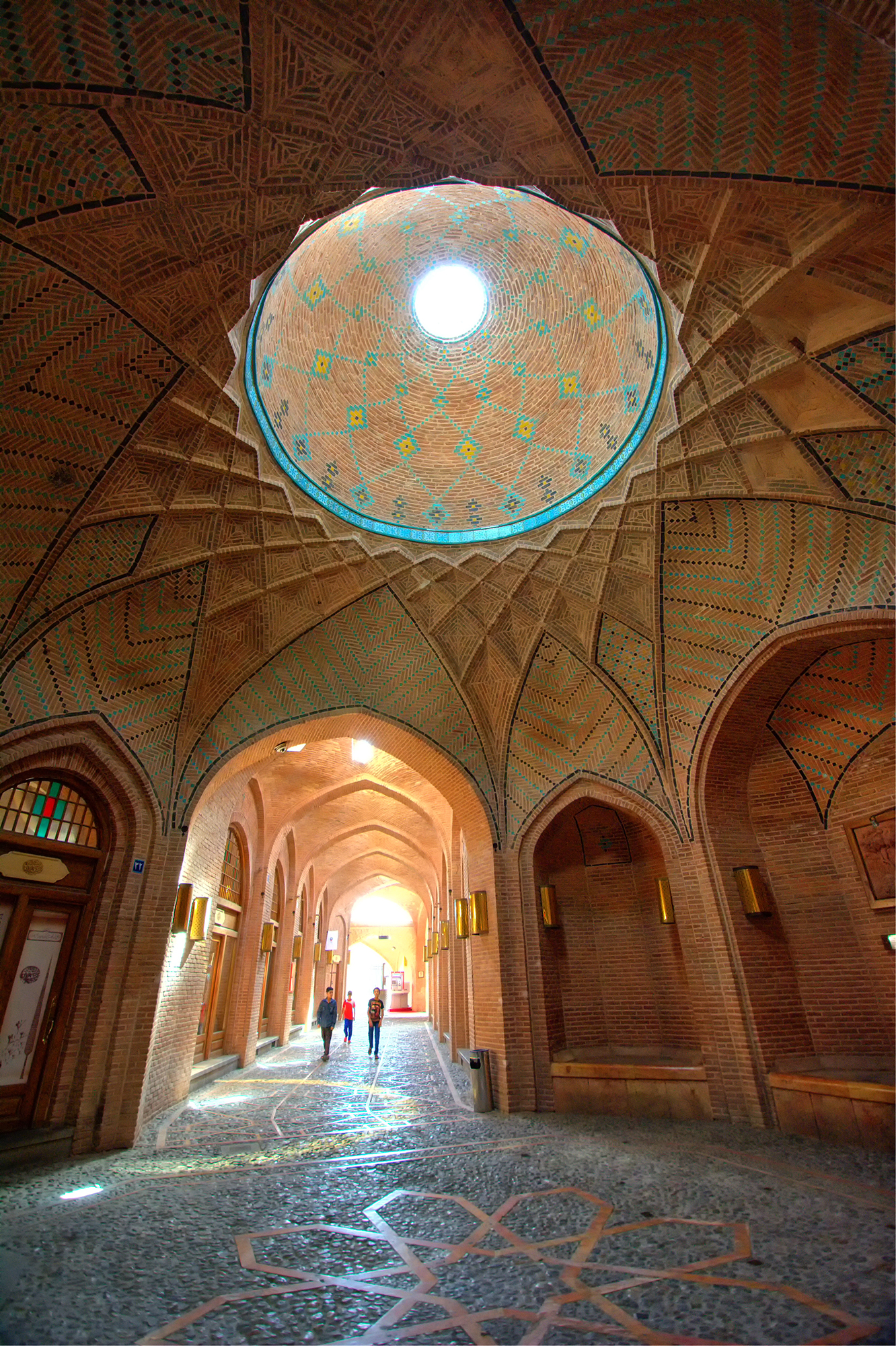
Caravanserai of Sa'd al-Saltaneh

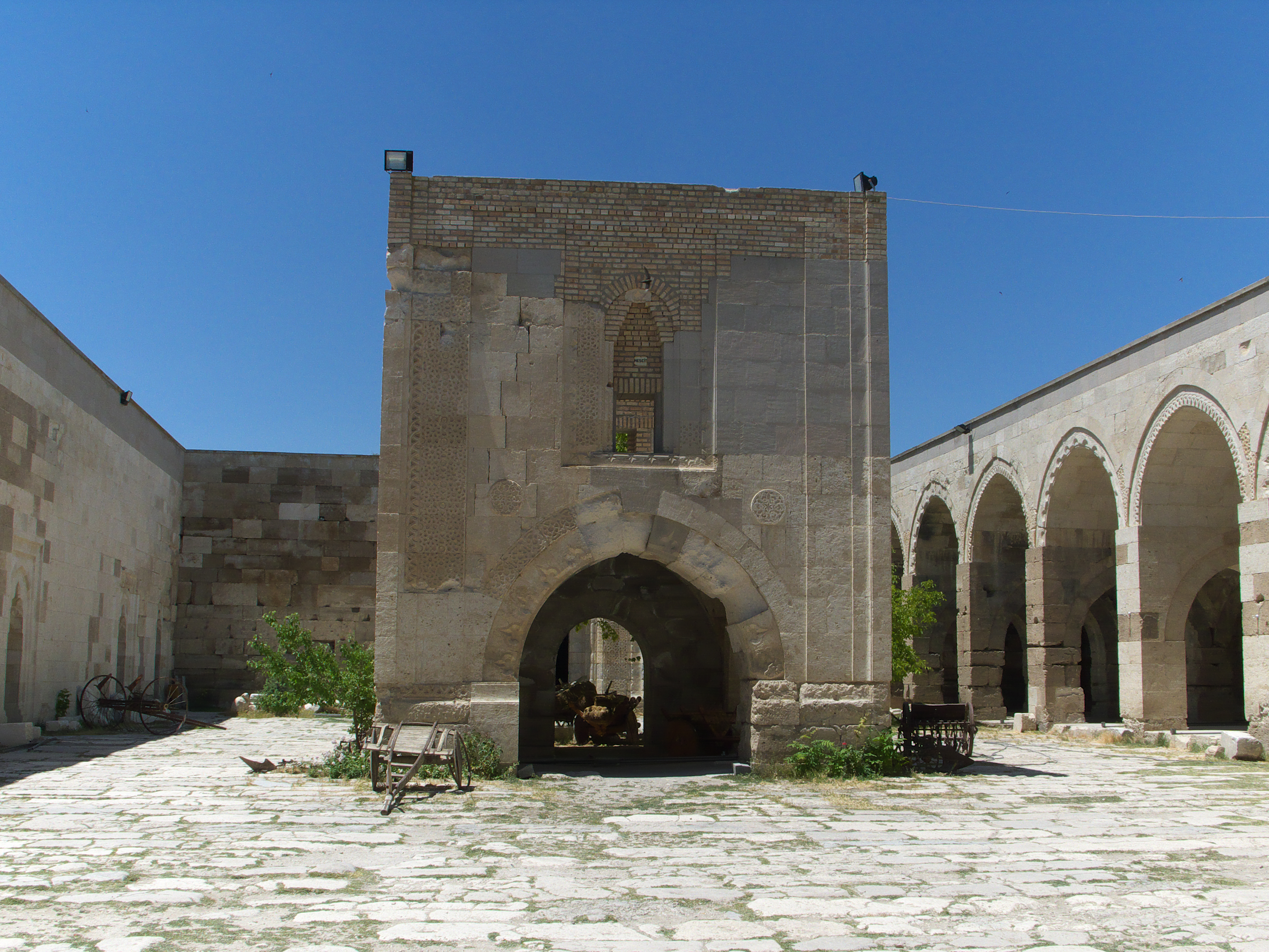
Sultanhanı caravanserai

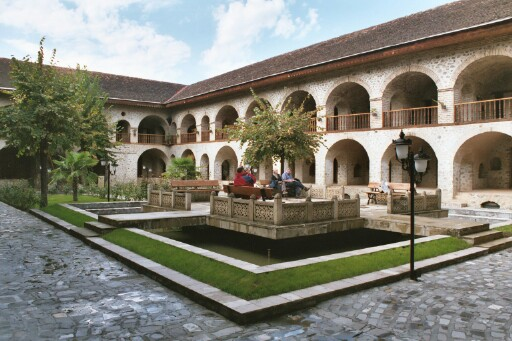
Shaki Caravanserai, Shaki, Azerbaijan

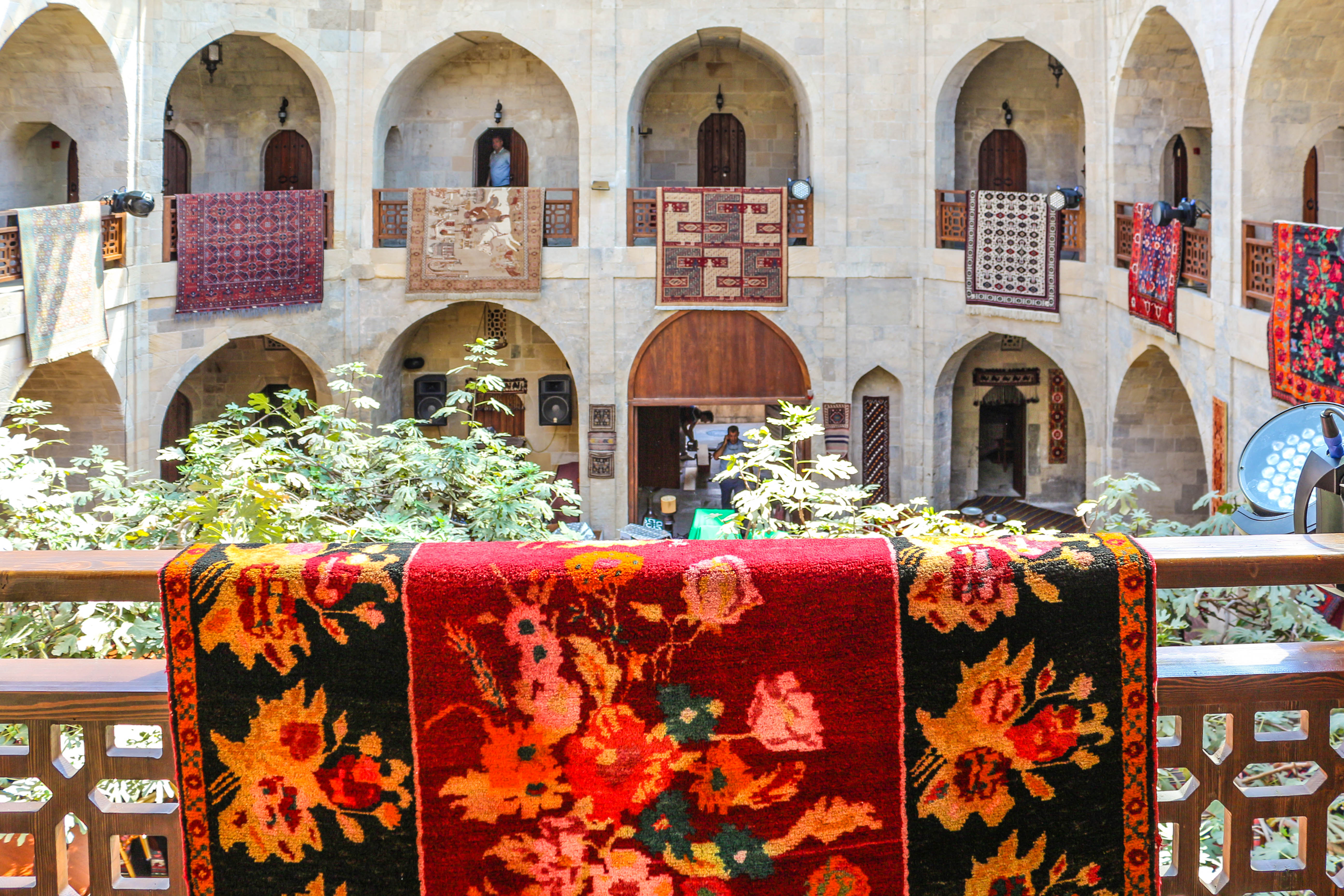
Two-Storeyed Caravanserai, Baku, Azerbaijan

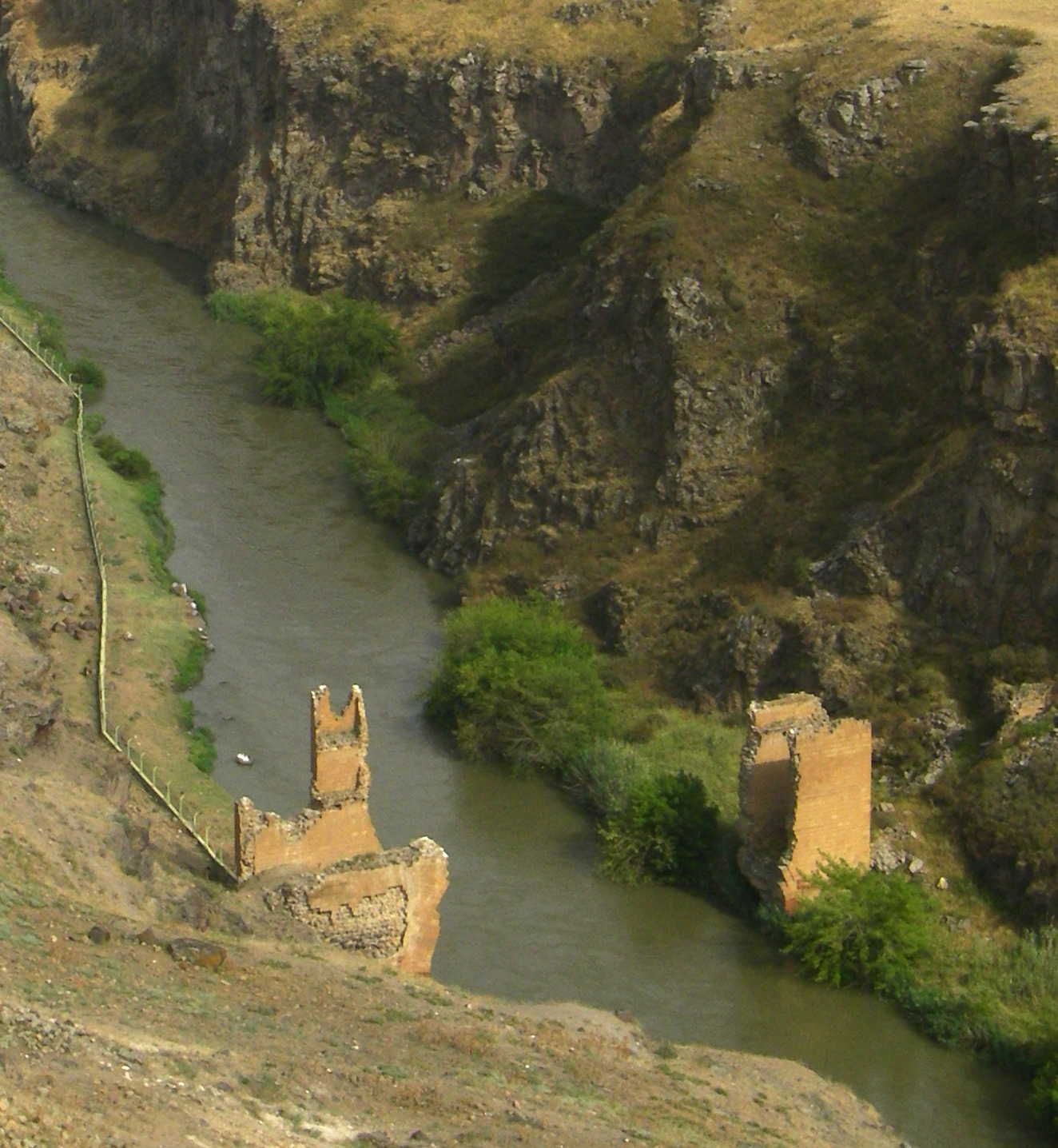
Bridge in Ani, capital of medieval Armenia

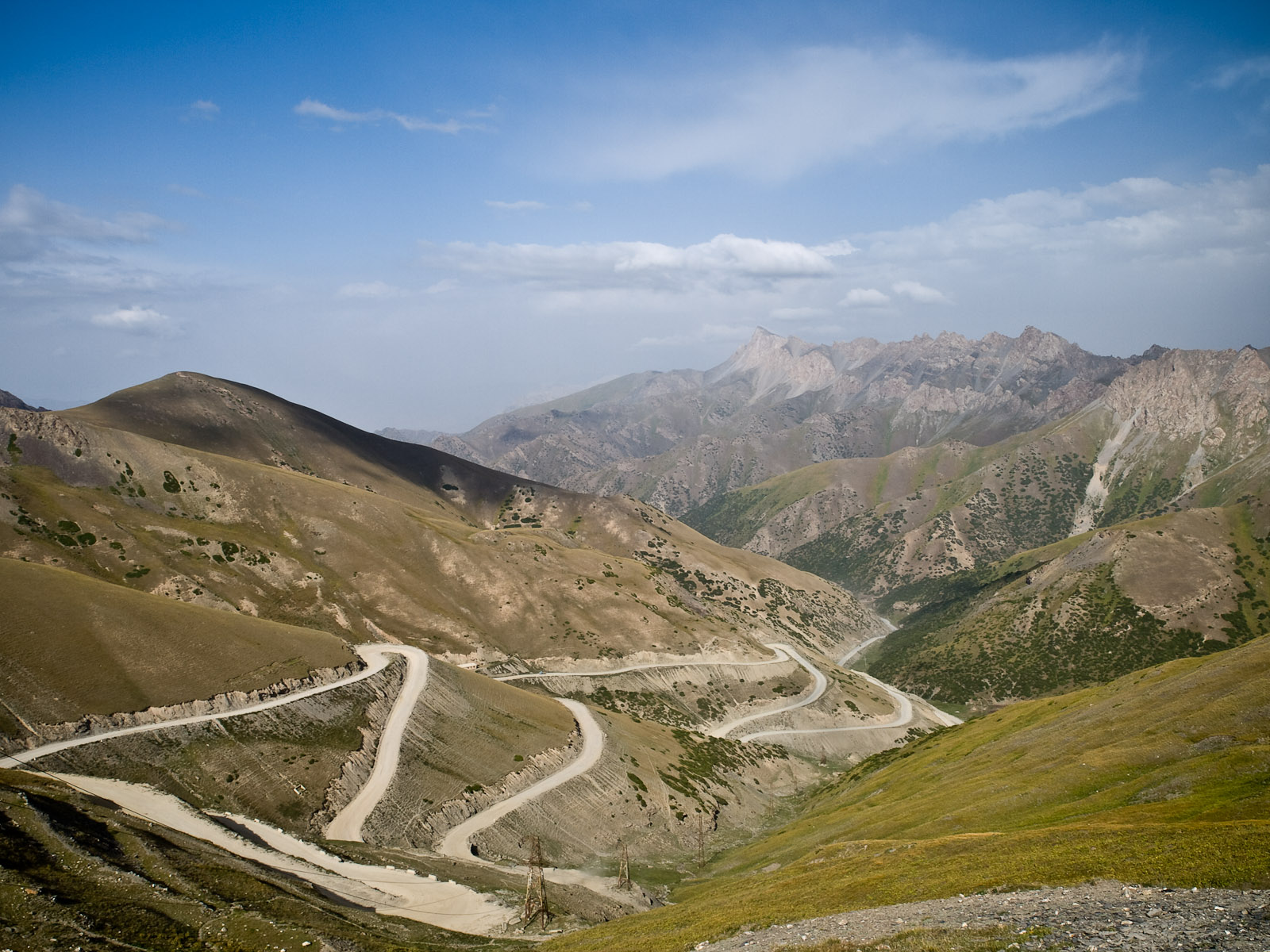
Taldyk pass

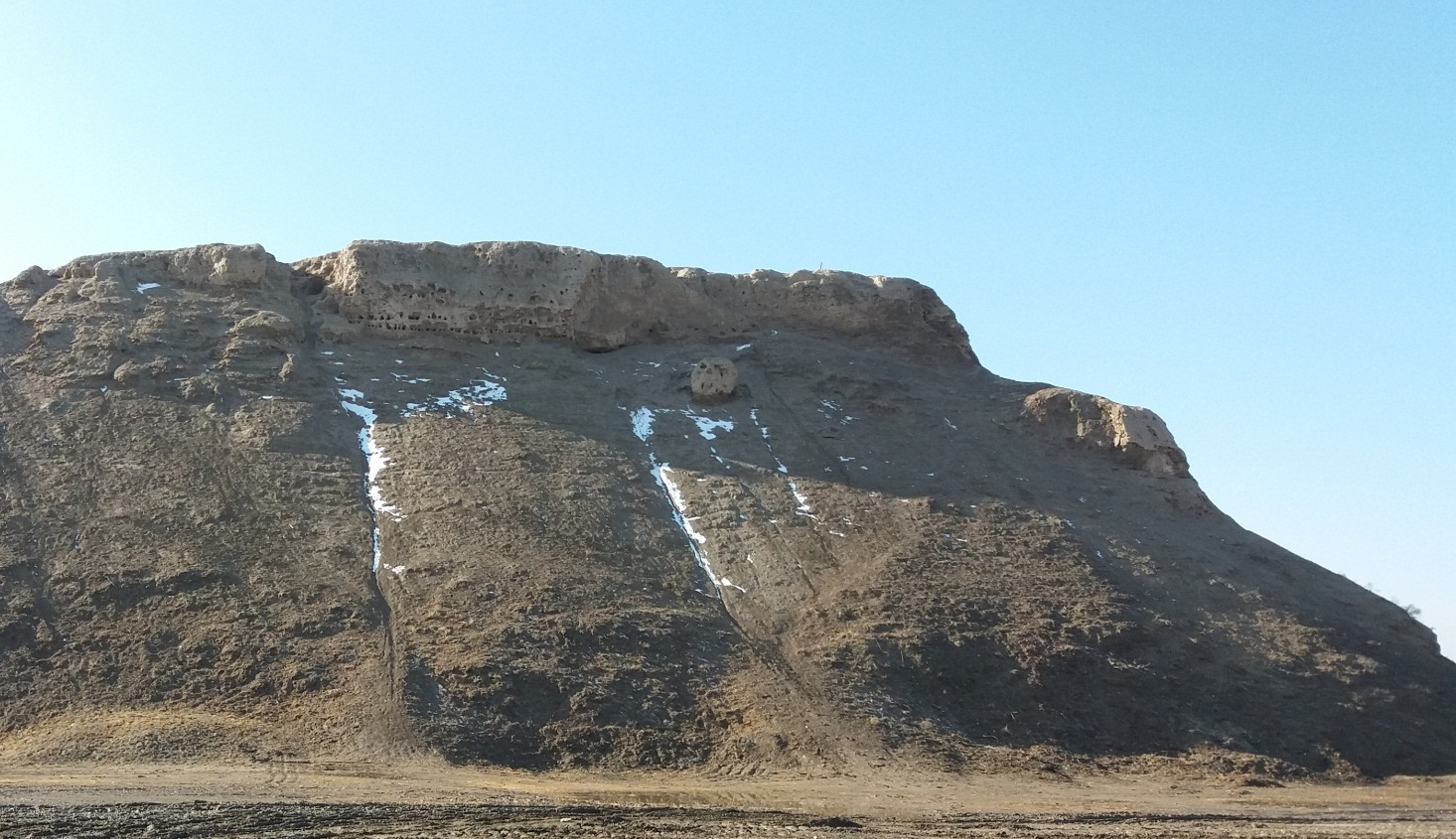
Medieval fortress of Amul, Turkmenabat, Turkmenistan

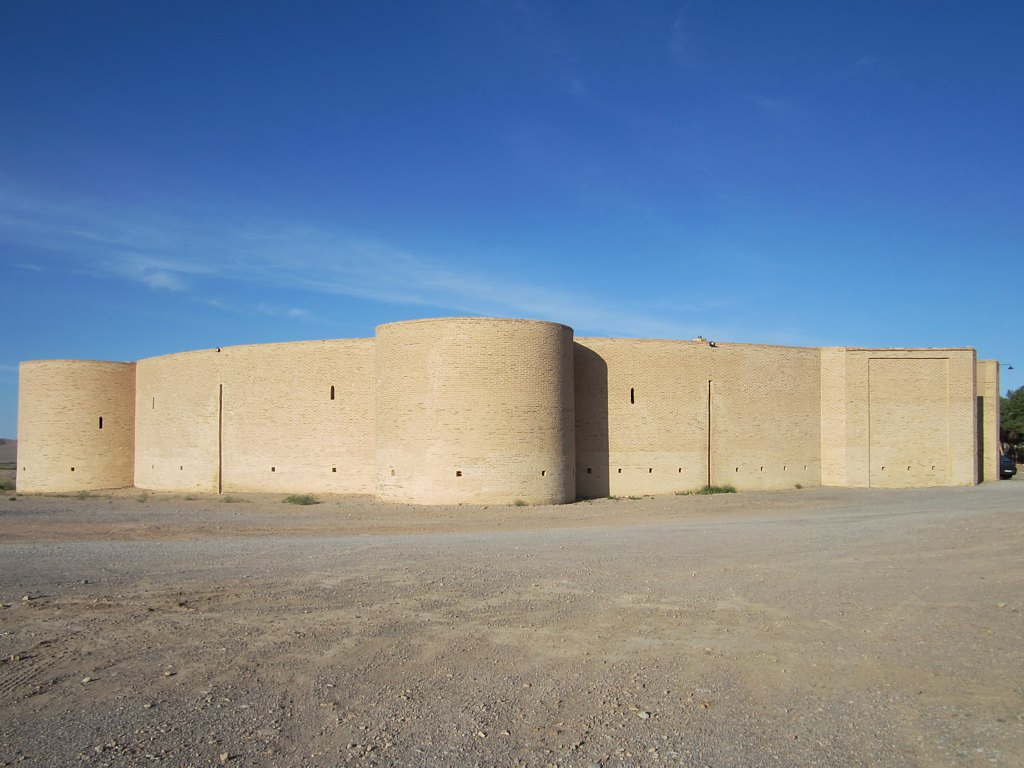
Zeinodin Caravanserai

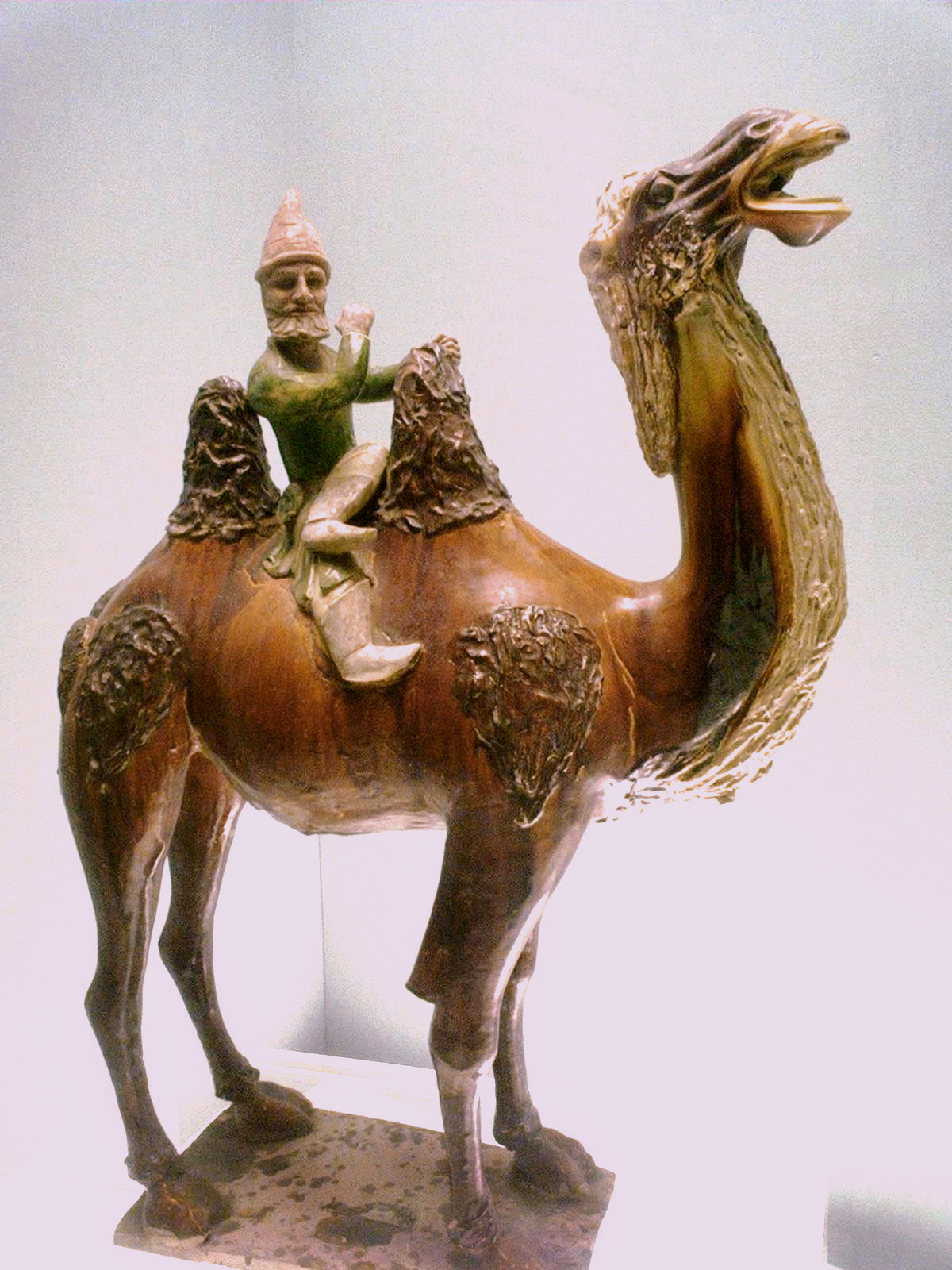
Sogdian man on a Bactrian camel, sancai ceramic glaze, Chinese Tang dynasty (618–907)

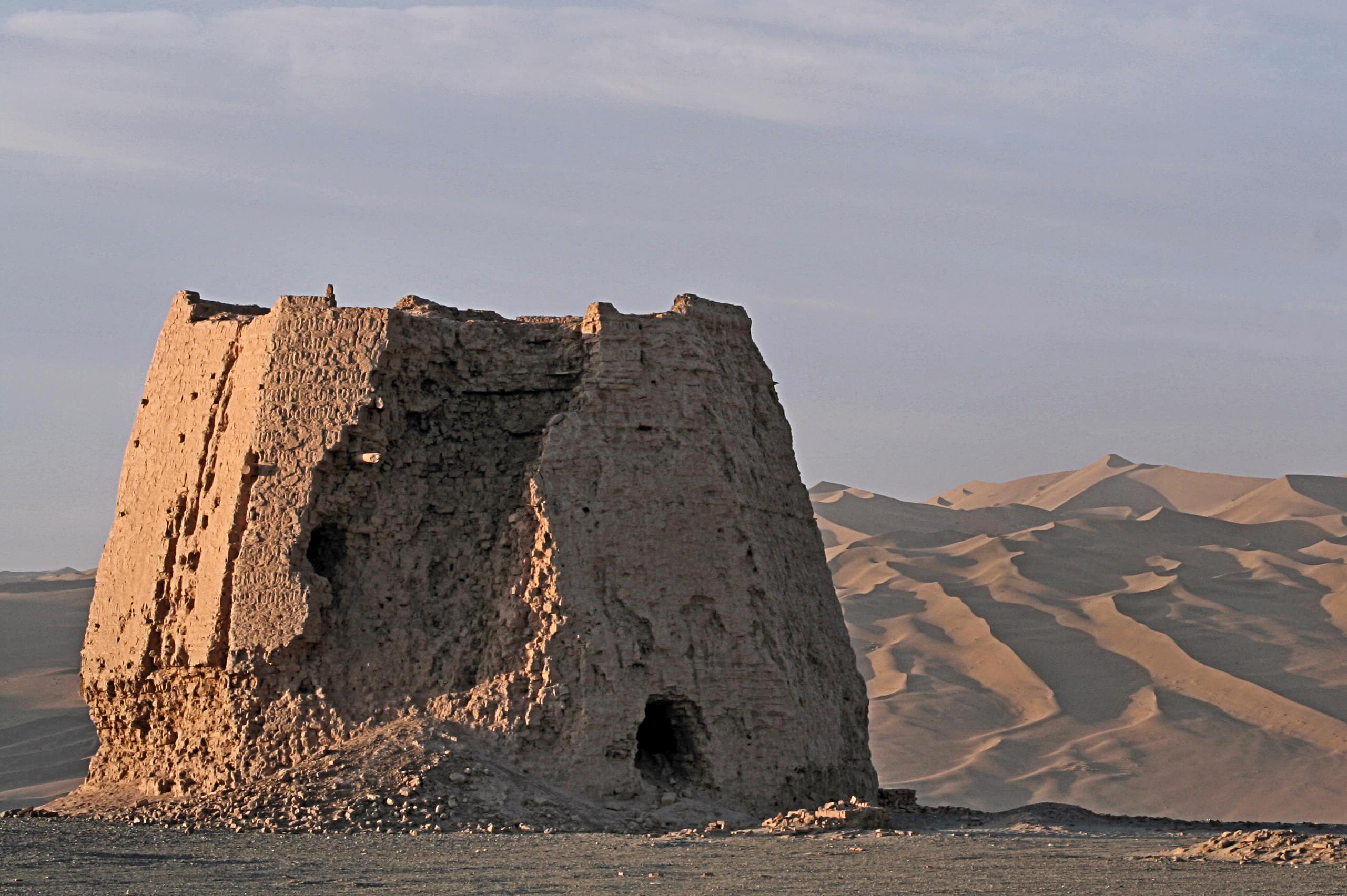
The ruins of a Han dynasty (206 BCE – 220 CE) Chinese watchtower made of rammed earth at Dunhuang, Gansu province

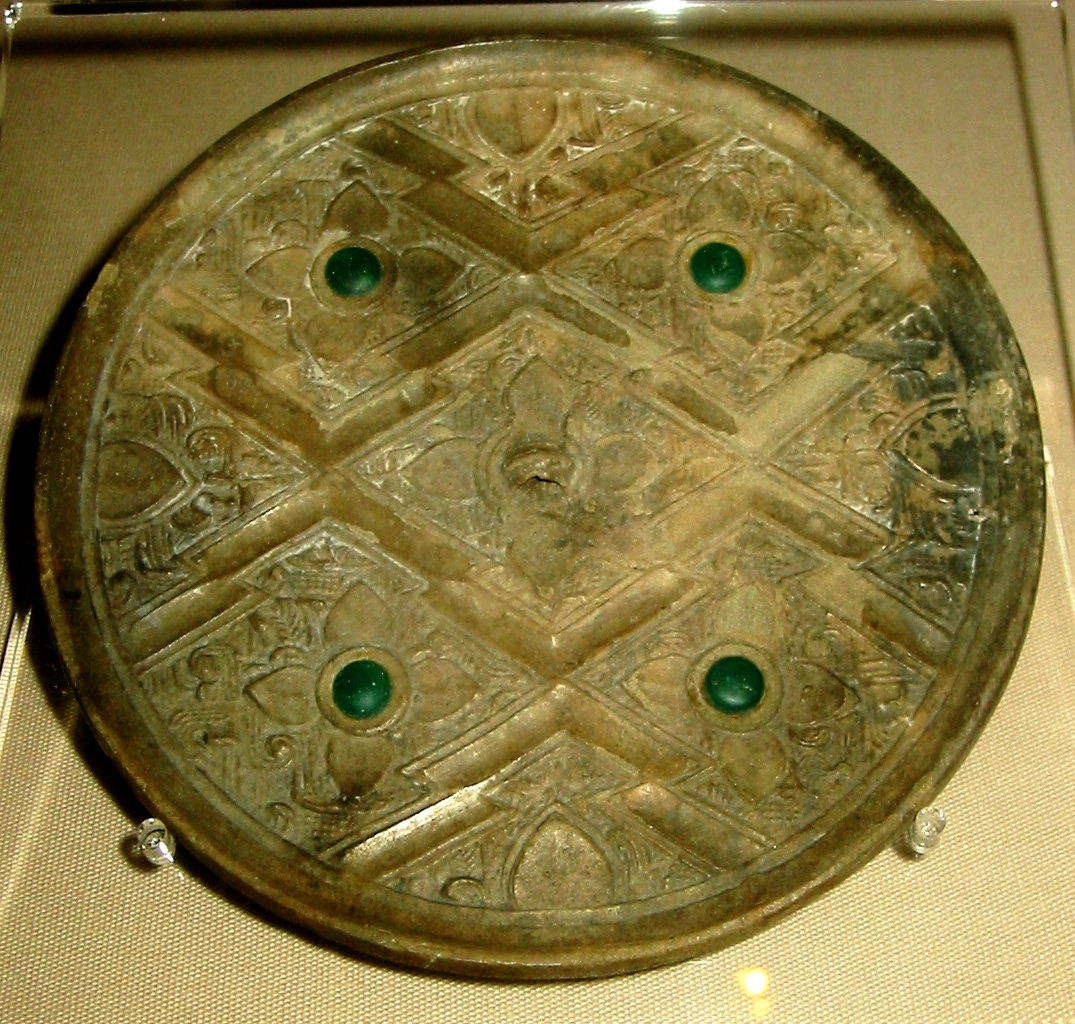
A late Zhou or early Han Chinese bronze mirror inlaid with glass, perhaps incorporated Greco-Roman artistic patterns

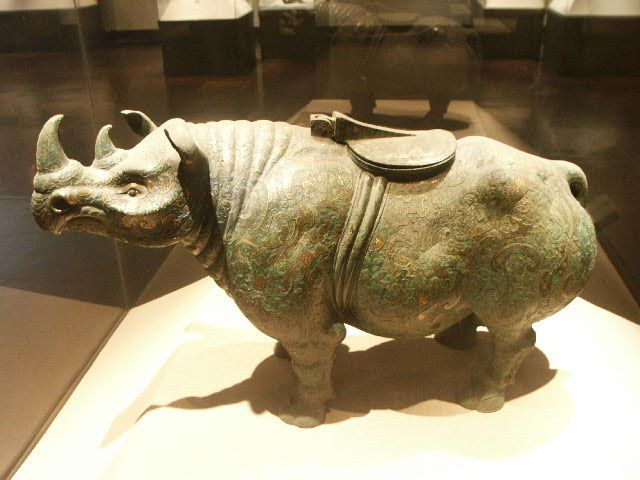
A Chinese Western Han dynasty (202 BCE – 9 CE) bronze rhinoceros with gold and silver inlay

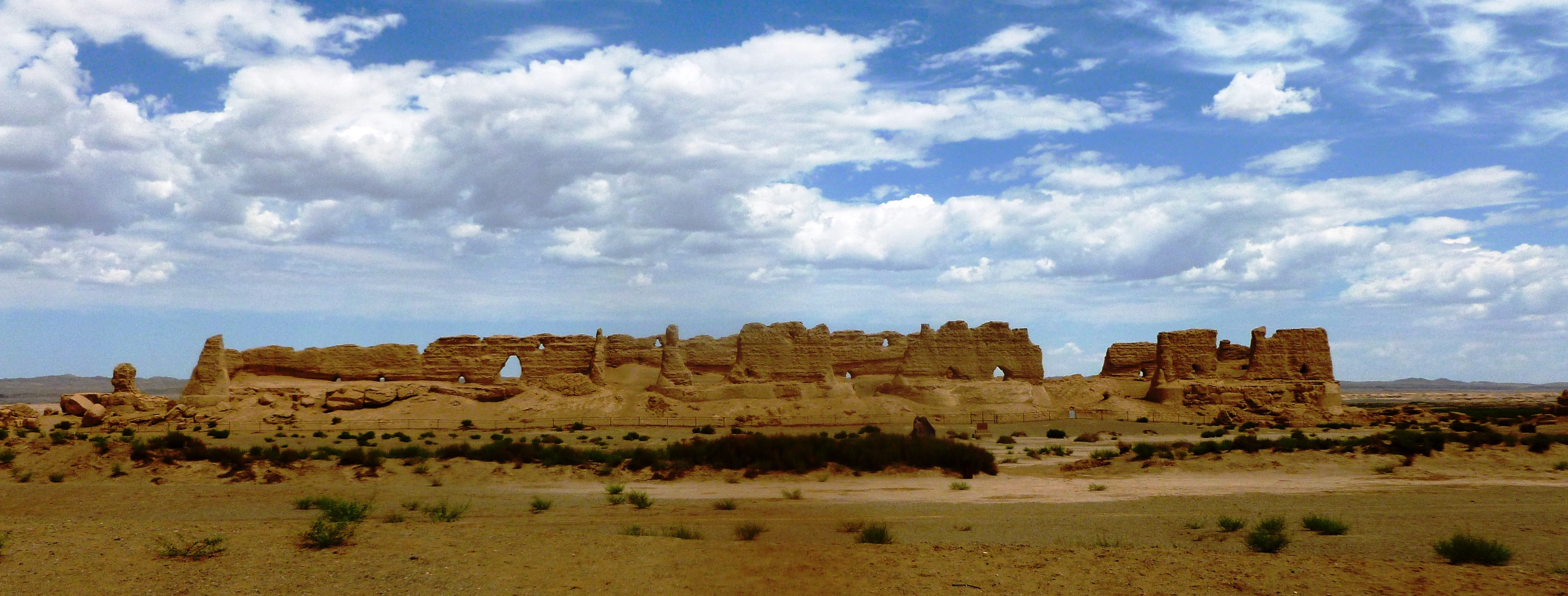
Han dynasty Granary west of Dunhuang on the Silk Road.

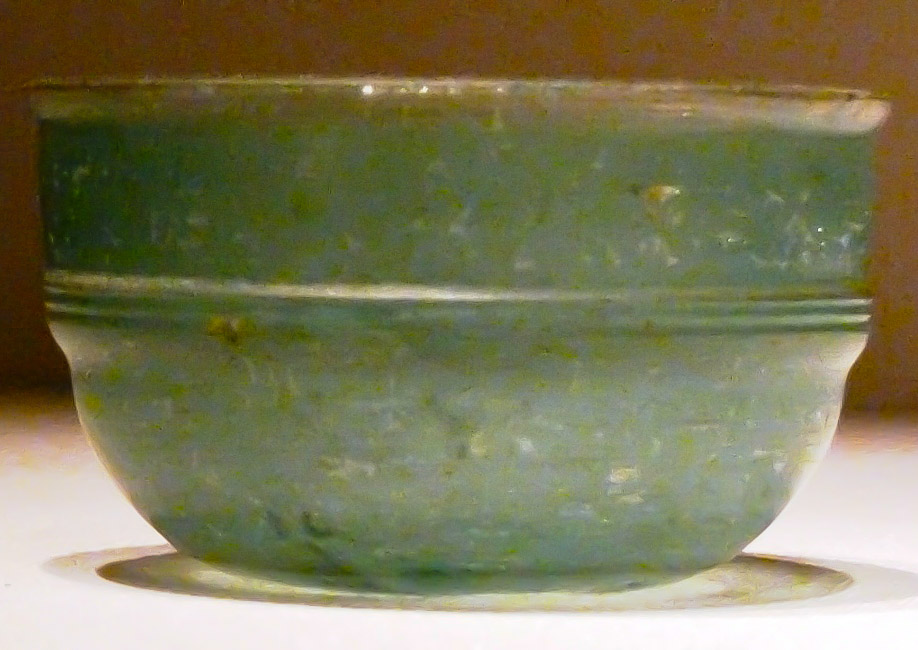
Green Roman glass cup unearthed from an Eastern Han dynasty (25–220 CE) tomb, Guangxi, southern China

== See also ==
- Dvārakā–Kamboja route
- Dzungarian Gate
- Global silver trade from the 16th to 19th centuries
- Godavaya
- Hippie trail
- History of silk
- Incense trade route
- Iron Age
- Mount Imeon
- Maritime Silk Road
- Serica
- Sericulture
- Silk Road Economic Belt
- Silk Road Fund
- Silk Road numismatics
- Stone Tower
- Suez Canal
- Three hares
