= Yitunbulake =

Yitunbulake 依吞布拉克镇 Yetimbulak, Qilanbulak
- Town
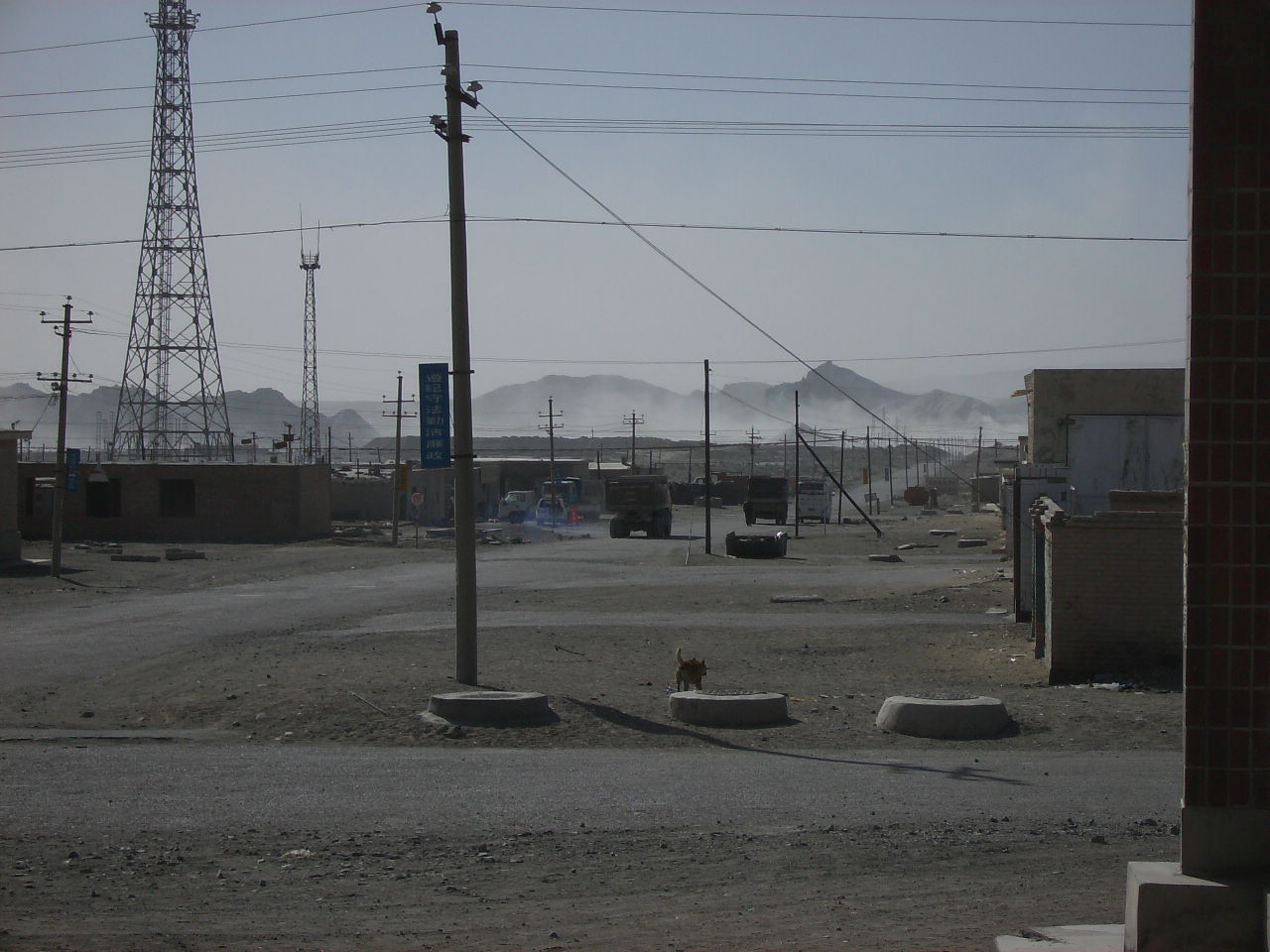
- Main street of Yitunbulake in 2007.

- Location in Xinjiang
- Coordinates: 38°23′7.4″N 90°09′16.99″E
- Country: China
- Region: Xinjiang
- Prefecture: Bayingolin Mongol Autonomous Prefecture
- County: Ruoqiang
- Founded: 1958, Officially established on November 5, 1983.
- Named for: Yitumbulak, a Uyghur word meaning lonely spring.

Area
  - Total: 5.5 km^{2} (2.1 sq mi)
- Elevation: 3,193 m (10,476 ft)

Population (2010)
  - Total: 800
  - Density: 150/km^{2} (380/sq mi)
- Time zone: UTC+8 (China Standard)
- Postal code: 841803
- Telephone area code: 0996

Yitunbulake Town (Chinese: 依吞布拉克镇; pinyin: Yītūnbùlākèzhèn; also Yetimbulak or Qilanbulak) is a town in Ruoqiang County, Bayin'gholin Mongol Autonomous Prefecture in southeastern Xinjiang, People's Republic of China.

== Location ==
The town lies at an altitude of 3,193 metres (10,476 ft), South of the Altyn-Tagh mountain range and close to the Qinghai Province border.

The China National Highway 315, linking Ruoqiang Town (256 kilometres (159 mi)) and Mangnai, passes Northeast of town, and other smaller roads lead to Tömürlük Township (to the Southeast) and Qimantag Township (320 kilometres (200 mi) to the South), as well as pastoral areas.

== Climate ==
Yitumbulak has a cold semi-arid climate, characterised by an extreme aridity. Spring is usually dry and windy, summer sees the majority of rainfall, autumn is mild and cool and winter is dry and cold, with little snow.

- Average annual temperature: 12.8 °C (55.0 °F)
- Average temperature in January: −8.6 °C (16.5 °F)
- Average temperature in July: 26.7 °C (80.1 °F)
- Average annual frost-free period: 150 days
- Average annual sunshine hours: 2647.6 hours
- Total annual radiation: 127.4 kcal/cm^{2}
- Average annual precipitation: 50.3 millimetres (1.98 in)

== History ==
In 1958, as the surrounding area developed mines of coal, lead, zinc and copper, and especially asbestos, a new mining town was created, and on November 5, 1983, the town of Yitunbulake (meaning "lonely spring" in Uyghur) was officially established.

== Administrative divisions ==
Yitunbulake Town has under its jurisdiction the communities of Yitunbulake (依吞布拉克社区居民委员会) and Arjin (阿尔金社区居民委员会).

== See also ==
- List of township-level divisions of Xinjiang
