= Ruoqiang =

Ruoqiang, also Charkliq, Charkhlik, Qarkilik, Chakliq, Jo-ch'ien, or Tcharghalyk can refer to:

- The town of Qakilik (or Ruoqiang, Charkhlik), in Ruoqiang (Qakilik) County, Xinjiang Uyghur Autonomous Region, China
- The Ruoqiang (Qakilik) County, Xinjiang Uyghur Autonomous Region, China, named after the former town in Uyghur and after the ancient Tibeto-Burman Ruoqiang people in Mandarin.
- The Charklik site, named after the town of Charkhlik (Qakilik), located in the modern Xinjiang Uyghur Autonomous Region, China
- The ancient Re Qiang nation, an ancient Tibeto-Burman people and protostate located between Xinjiang, Qinghai and Tibet
