= Loulan Museum =

Museum in Xinjiang, China

Coordinates: 39.0154°N 88.1642°E

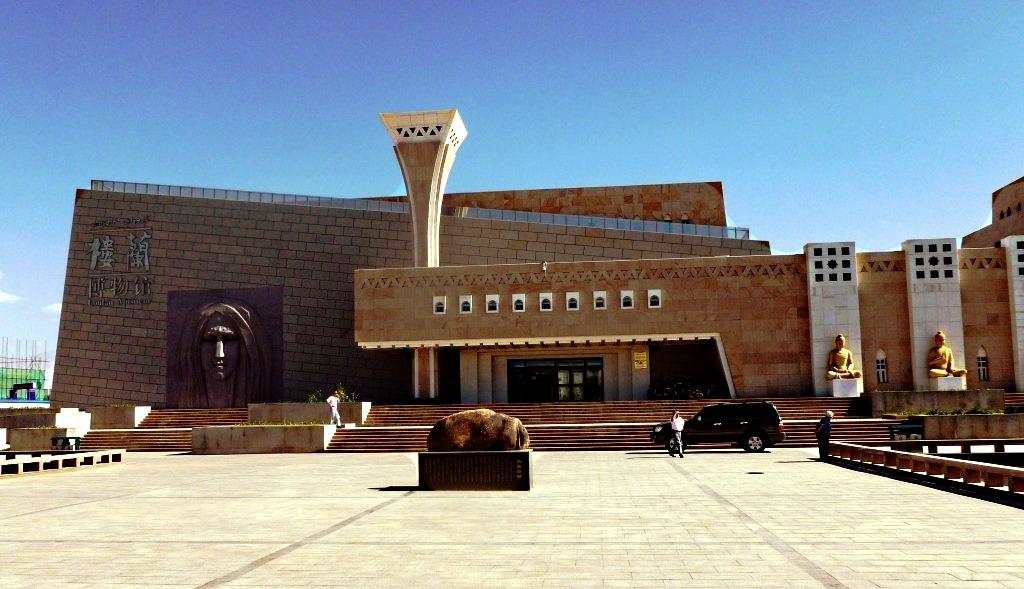
The entrance to the Loulan Museum

The Loulan Museum (Chinese: 楼兰博物馆) is the museum located in Ruoqiang County in the southeastern part of Xinjiang Uyghur Autonomous Region, China. On exhibit in this museum are the cultural artifacts excavated in the ancient cities of Loulan, Miran and Xiaohe Cemetery.

The Loulan Museum officially opened on May 3, 2011, with the floor space of 4,688 square meters. The Loulan Beauty and other artifacts excavated in this region are currently on display here, and at two other museums: the Xinjiang Uyghur Autonomous Region Museum, Ürümqi, Xinjiang, and the Lüshun Museum (Otani Collection), Dalian, Liaoning.

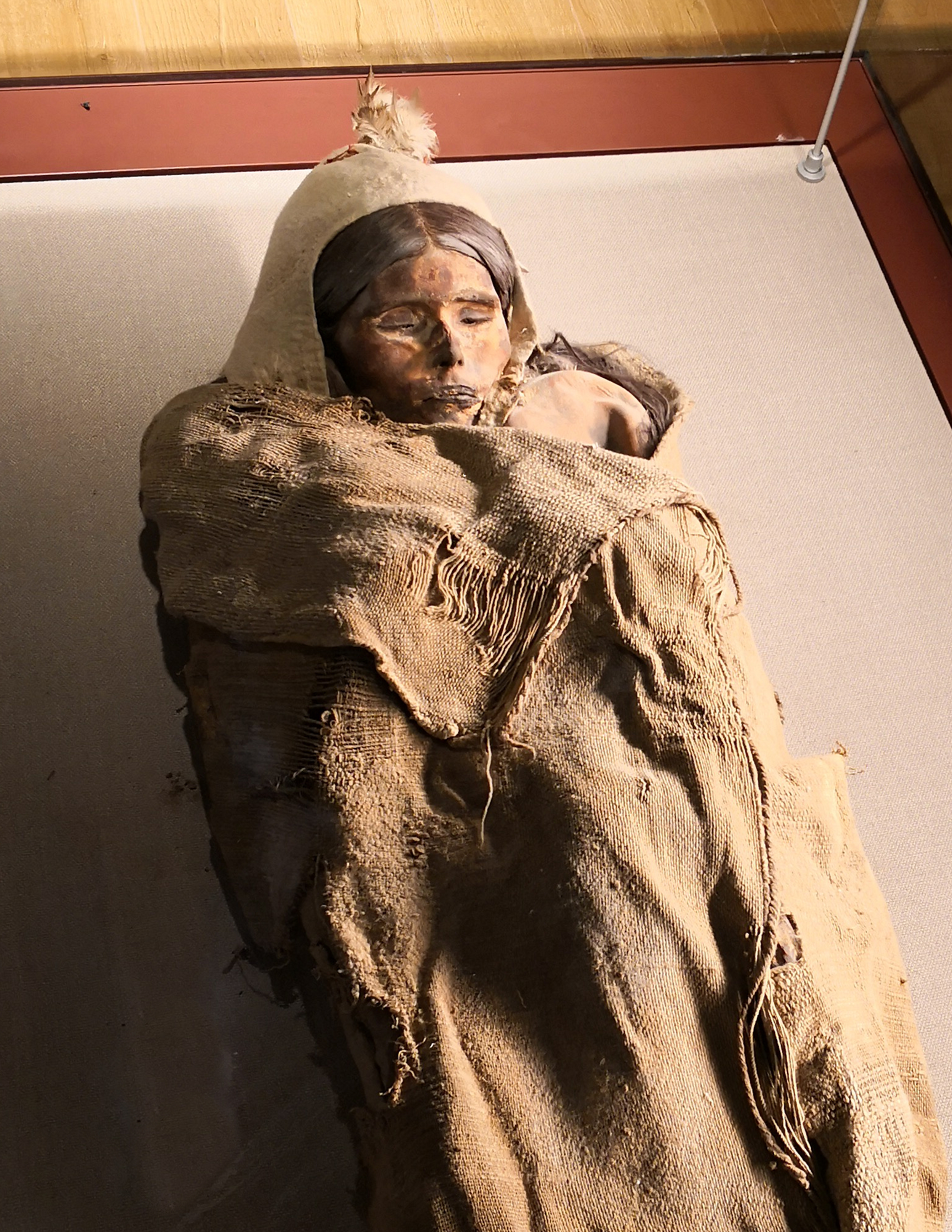
The Beauty of Loulan

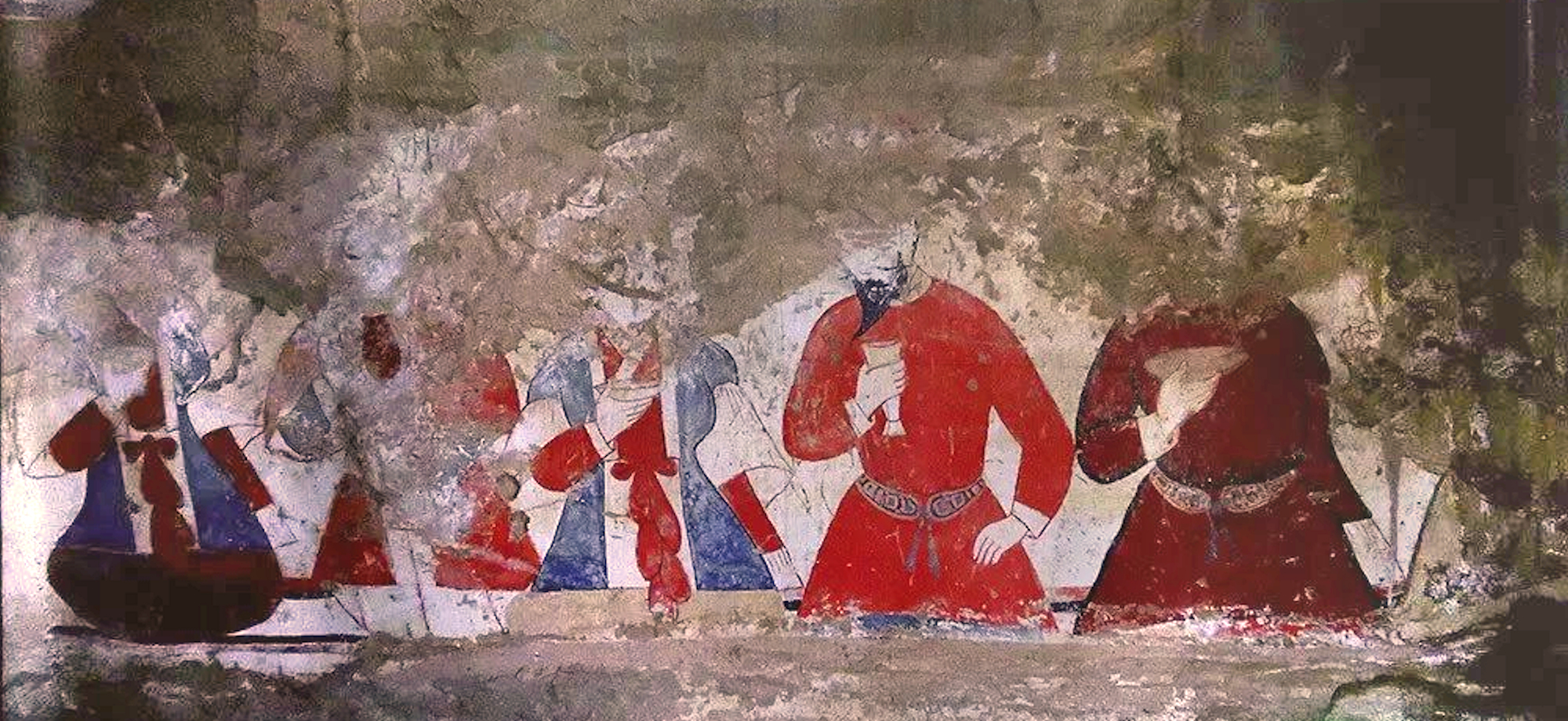
Loulan Tomb mural (4th–5th centuries CE)

== Transport ==
- Air: Ruoqiang Loulan Airport
- Railway: Ruoqiang Station (zh:若羌站) of Hotan–Ruoqiang railway
- Railway: Ruoqiang Station of Golmud–Korla railway
- Highway: China National Highway 218 (North-South)
- Highway: China National Highway 315 (East-West)

== See also ==
- Xinjiang Uyghur Autonomous Region Museum
- Lüshun Museum
