= Silk Road (Khotan) =

Of the various Silk Road routes, some are thought to have gone through Khotan (modern-day Hotan, Xinjiang, China), an oasis town on the southern edge of the Taklamakan Desert.

== Academic exploration ==
The first Western academic to explore this theory in detail was British archaeologist Aurel Stein, coming from the west through Kashgar and entering the Taklamakan Desert in September 1900, before heading south to Hotan on his first expedition to Serindia. Stein returned several times, extending his research area to increase the known sites along the Silk Road in this region. During those expeditions, Stein suggested that the Silk Road had several routes, with two of them going through the Taklamakan, one to the north and one to the south, and that these may have operated at different times.

== Establishment of a southern route ==
It is unknown when the South Taklamakan Route was first used, but silk from c 1500 BC has been found in Bactria, suggesting the use of the route very early in history. Khotan was possibly the source of nephrite for China as early as 645 BC. However, from historical sources, such as the writings from Sima Qian, it seems the route was poorly known before the 2nd century BC and that its importance was during the Han period, when Khotan had garrisons to protect it. The importance that this route had is illustrated by the bronze Sino-Kharosthi coins, based on the tetradrachm from the 1st century AD, that have been found in Hotan, suggesting an already well established relationship between China and the Indo-Greek empires through Khotan in the beginning of the Han era. Moreover, mitochondrial DNA analyses indicate that Central Asian population share genes with East Asians and Europeans, suggesting regular contacts between them.

== Advantages of a southern route ==
=== Importance of Khotan ===
Khotan was a source of nephrite, a material much valued in China since the Hongshan period. In spring and summer, when the ice melts on the Kunlun Mountains, large nephrite boulders are brought down in the area (which explains the name of the two rivers flowing in Yoktan: Karakash (Black Jade) and Yurungkash (White Jade)). Khotan was also an important Buddhist centre, with its mythical creation during the reign of Asoka. Later, numerous Chinese monks came to Khotan in order to study the scriptures stored there, some in early Brahmi forms.

=== Topography and climate ===
The Kunlun Mountains bordering the southern edge of Khotan brought water into the region. Shade from the Kunlun Mountains (nearly 6,000 meters on the high edges bordering the Taklamakan desert near Yotkan) was probably well appreciated on the route. They provided a more stable environment for the kingdom, located as it was in a valley system, where the temperatures range from -10 °C to 0 °C in January (the coldest month) and from 20 °C to 30 °C in July (the hottest month). In heavy contrast, temperatures at the center of the desert can go as low as - 24 °C and as high as 40 °C. The existence of a myriad of small oases in the desert was probably used by caravans and many such small oases were represented on Aurel Stein's maps.

=== Unstable politics ===
Political instabilities affected both the northern and the southern routes at different times. For example, the Northern routes were disrupted by the upheavals during the rise of the Uyghur and First Turkic Khaganates. However, the southern route was also disrupted, for example during the expansion of the Tibetan Empire in the late 7th to 8th-century CE.

== Route ==
There is little doubt that any east-west route would have passed through Anxi and Dunhuang, before dividing to the northern and southern routes around the Taklamakan Desert. Letters, such as one from the king of Khotan giving his daughter to the ruling family of Dunhuang in AD 941, suggest that the links between these areas were strong. From Dunhuang, the most likely route would go to Miran, which became a Tibetan city, from which numerous written records from the late seventh and eighth century AD have been recovered. From Miran, the route probably moved from one oasis or river valley to the next, along the foothills of the mountains, through sites such as Charklik, Waxxari, Charchan, Endere, Mingfeng, and Niya to Khotan. The route after that probably included Pishan and Yarkand before reaching Kashgar.

The elevation of the routes is relatively high on the slope, with a relatively small change in altitude (an average of 0.7%, -0.6% except at the extremities). This was important as the slope would be an important factor for animals carrying heavy packs. Khotan is situated in a pleasant valley that probably protected it from harsh weather.

=== Connections with other routes ===
The southern Taklamakan route also connected with trans-Tibetan Plateau routes linking Central and South Asia.
