= Altun Shan National Nature Reserve =

Natural reserve in Xinjiang, China

- (also: Aerjinshan)
- IUCN category IV (habitat/species management area)
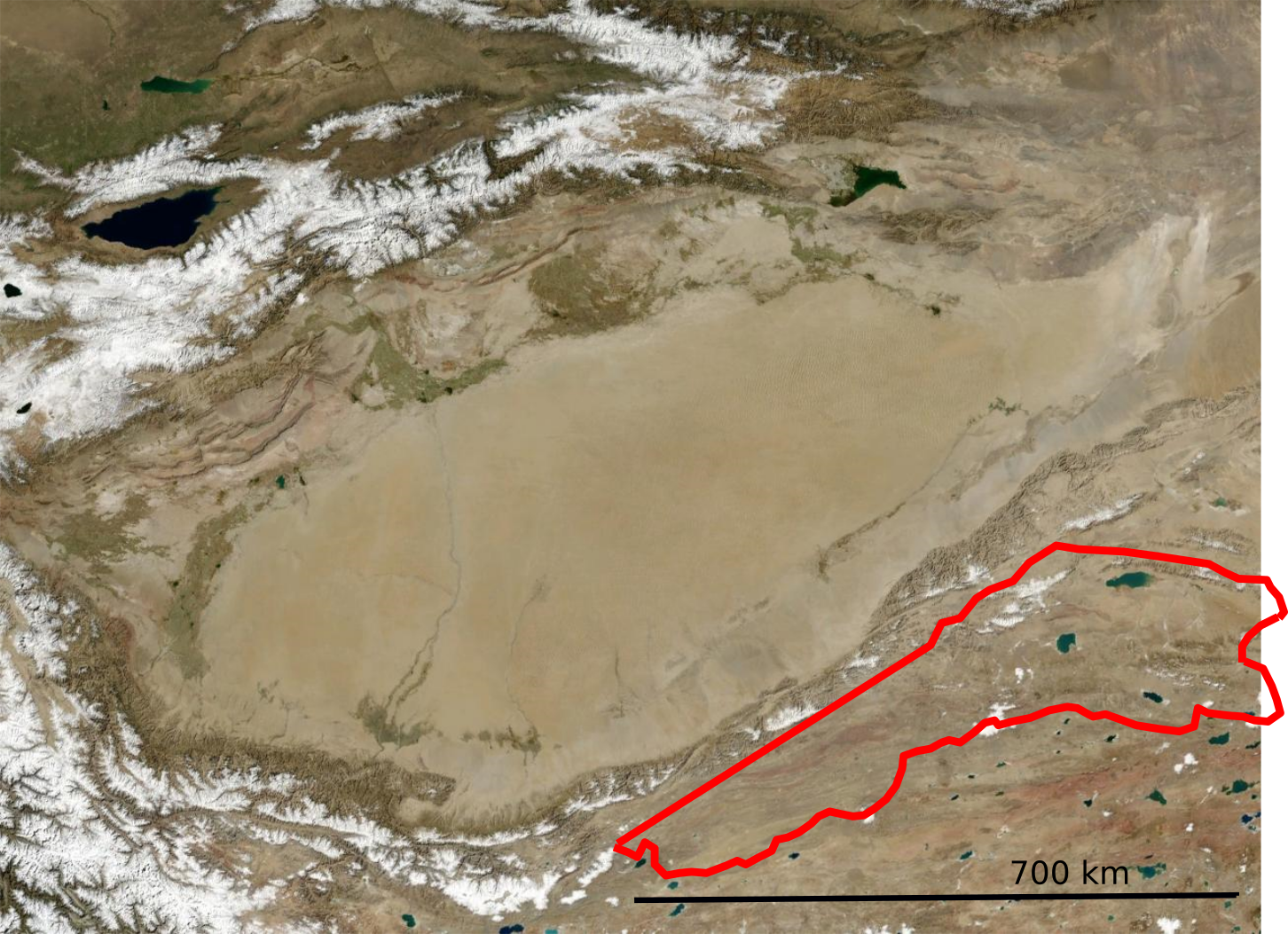
- Borders of Altun Shan Reserve (in Red)

- Location within China
- Location: Xinjiang Autonomous Region, China
- Nearest city: Ruoqiang Town, Ruoqiang County
- Coordinates: 38.598°N 88.997°E
- Area: 1,512,500 ha (15,125 km^{2}; 5,840 mi^{2})
- Established: 1983

Altun Shan National Nature Reserve (simplified Chinese: 阿尔金山; traditional Chinese: 阿爾金山; pinyin: Ā'ěr jīnshān) (literally, "O You Golden Mountain") is a large, arid area in the southeast of Xinjiang Autonomous Region, on the northern edge of the Tibetan plateau and the southern edge of the Tarim Basin in northwest China. It surrounds the Kumkol Basin, an endorheic basin (no outlets to the sea) in the western third of the Altyn-Tagh mountains ("Altun Shan"). The reserve is sometimes referred to as the "Arjin Mountains Nature Reserve", or "Aerjinshan". The reserve covers the southern portions of Qiemo County and Ruoqiang County (including Qimantag Township (祁曼塔格乡)) of Bayingolin Mongol Autonomous Prefecture in Xinjiang.

== Topography ==
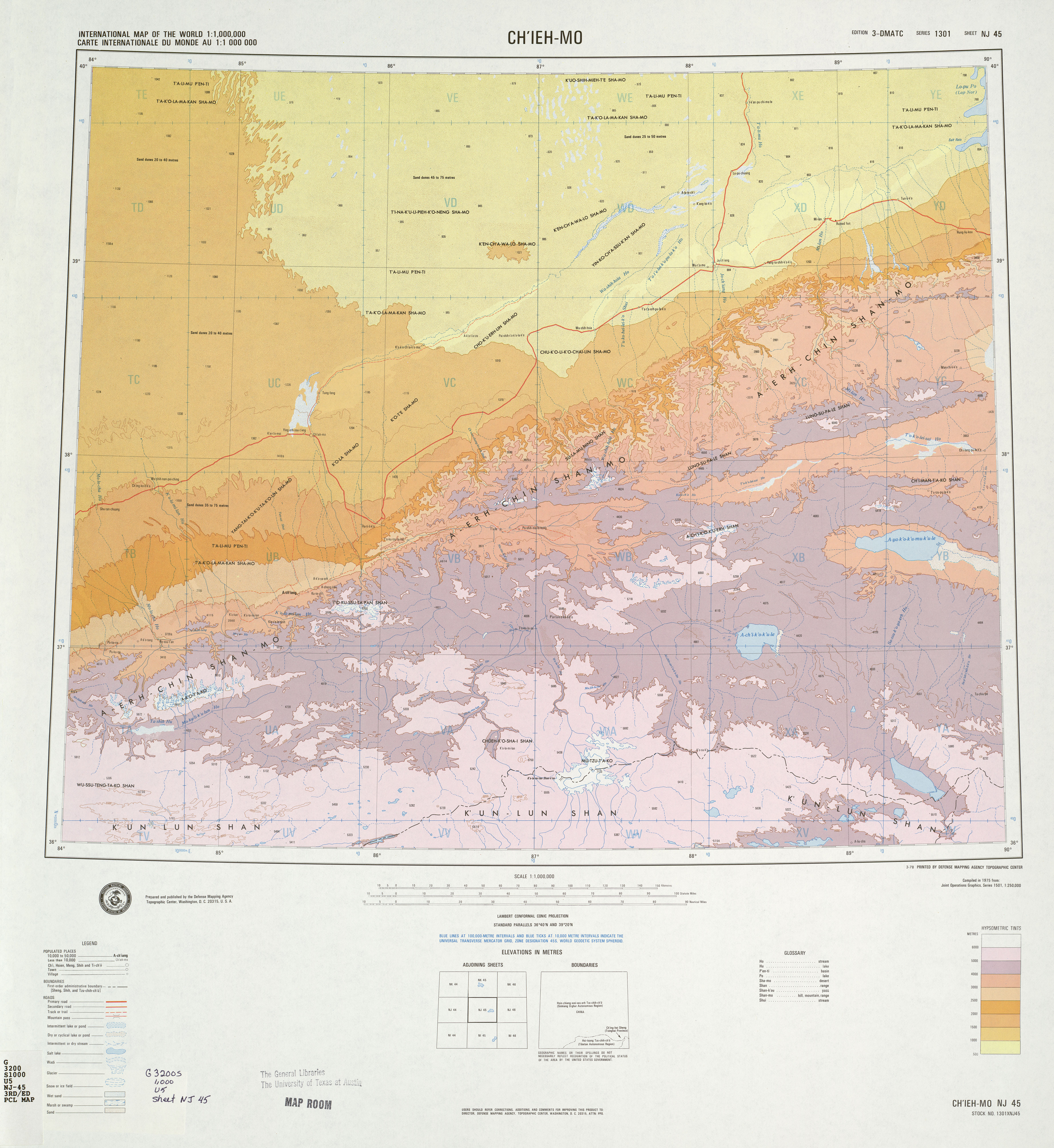
Map including areas in the eastern part of the Altun Shan National Nature Reserve (1975)

The Altun Shan Reserve is an elongated triangular area on the southern edge of the Taklamakan Desert, just south of the Tarim Basin. The reserve occupies the V-shaped region between the southern slopes of the Altun Shan range on the north and the northern slopes of the Kulun mountain range on the south. The eastern third of the reserve is the Komkul Basin, an arid plateau at an altitude of 4,500 meters. The reserve measures about 800 km west–east, and 200 km north–south. There are no permanent towns or roads in the area.

There are three large lakes in the Kumkol basin of the reserve: Lake Ayakum, Lake Aqqikkal, and Lake Jingyu. All are saline ("salt lakes"). The northernmost, Lake Ayakum, is at an altitude of 12,685 feet and has an area of 283 sqmi. Its depth reaches 74 feet. To the west of Lake Ayakum is Lake Aqqikkal, at an altitude of 13,940 ft, and which is 16 miles across. Lake Jingyu is the southernmost.

== Climate ==
Because of its high altitude (over 4,500 meters above sea level) and arid location thousands of kilometers from any ocean and in the rain shadow of the Himalayas and other mountain, the climate of the reserve is "Cold desert climate" (Köppen climate classification "BWk" ). This climate is characterized by hot, dry summers, and very cold, dry winters. At the highest elevations, the climate is a Polar climate (Koppen "ET") with cooler summers but still cold and dry in the winter.

== Ecoregion ==
Most of the reserve is in the "North Tibetan Plateau-Kunlun Mountains alpine desert" ecoregion, an area characterized by extreme aridity, high winds, and very cold winters. The northeast of the reserve around Lake Ayakum is in the Qaidam Basin semi-desert ecoregion. Qaidam is the Mongolian word for "salt", and the region is one of gravelly desert and some saline meadows and salt lakes. Temperatures reach an average high of 56.5 °F (13.6 °C) in August, and average lows of −18.6 °F (−28.1 °C) in January. There is little to no precipitation in most years, but some frost cover.

== Flora and fauna ==
The reserve provides space outside of human development for some of the largest herds of hoofed in Asia: the vulnerable Tibetan wild yak (Bos mutus) (an estimated 10,000), wild ass (30,000), and Tibetan antelope (Pantholops hodgsonii) (up to 75,000). The area is also an important habitat for the endangered Kozlov's Pika, and the relatively common Ladak pika. There are also small populations of dholes (Wild Asiatic dogs). Wolves, Snow leopards and Tibetan blue bears also live in this area.

== Access ==
Access is restricted, and high permit fees are required to enter. The soil is fragile and there are no permanent roads.

== See also ==
- List of protected areas of China
