= Ruoqiang County =

Ruoqiang County 若羌县 (Chinese) چاقىلىق ناھىيىسى (Uyghur) Qakilik, Charkhlik, Chochiang
- County
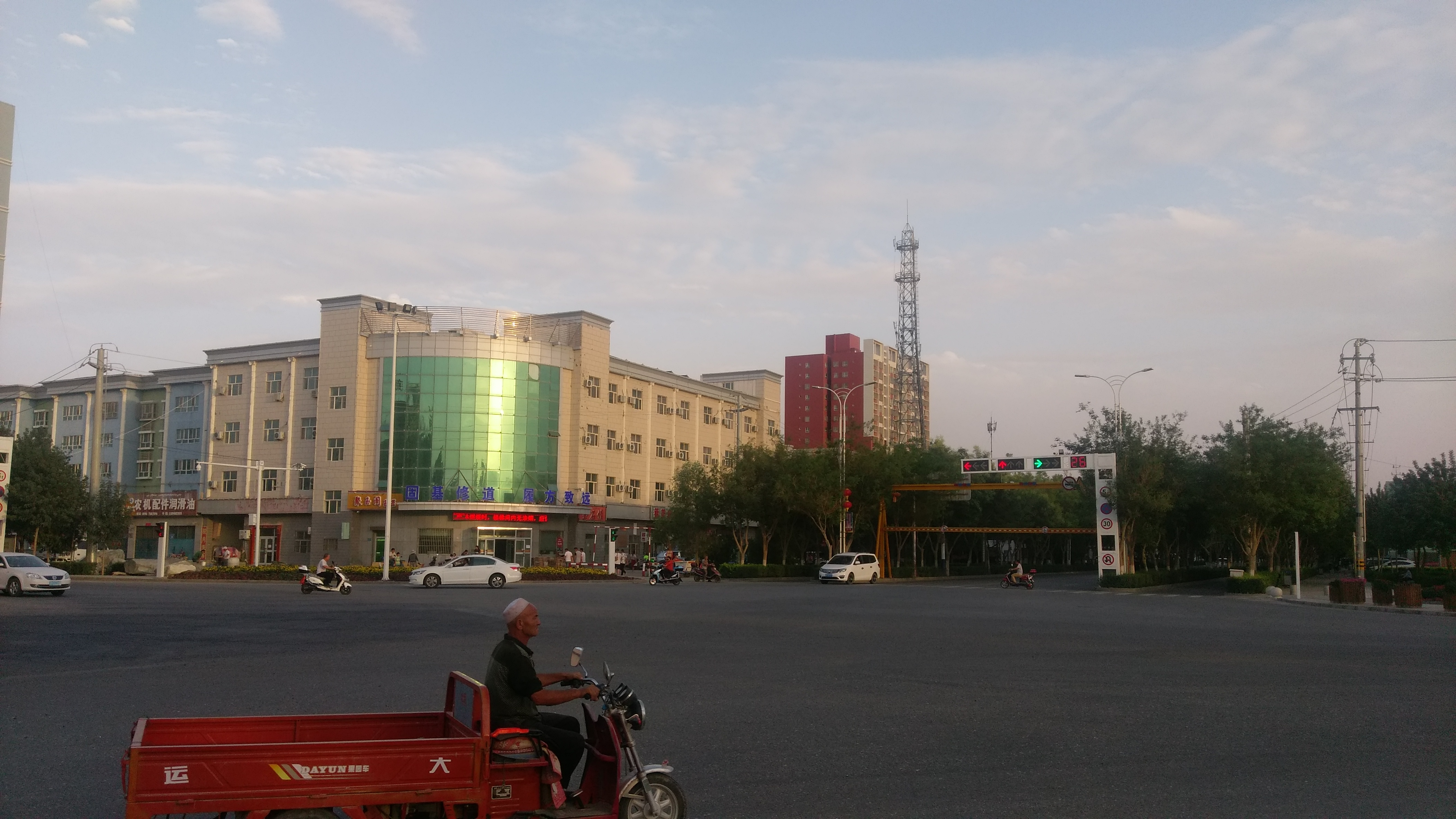

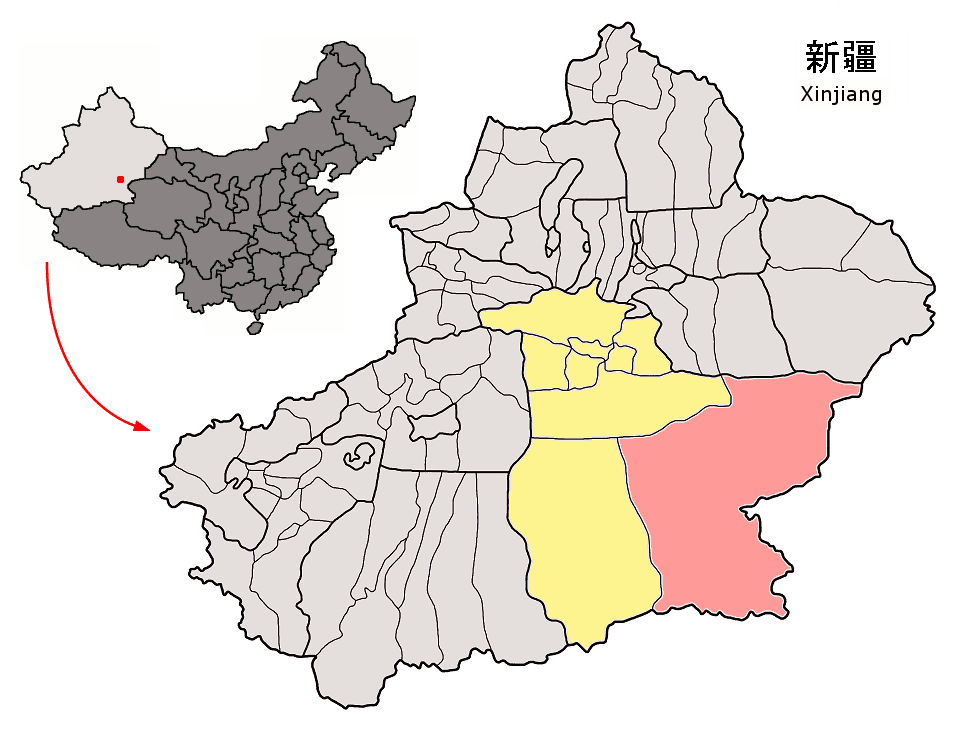
- Ruoqiang County (red) within Bayingolin Prefecture (yellow) and Xinjiang

- Location of the seat in Xinjiang Ruoqiang (Bayingolin) Ruoqiang (China)
- Coordinates (County government): 39°01′23″N 88°10′01″E
- Country: China
- Region: Xinjiang
- Autonomous prefecture: Bayingolin
- County seat: Ruoqiang Town (Qakilik)

Area
  - Total: 199,222 km^{2} (76,920 sq mi)
- Elevation: 896 m (2,940 ft)

Population (2020)
  - Total: 43,045
  - Density: 0.21607/km^{2} (0.55961/sq mi)

Ethnic groups
  - Major ethnic groups: Han Chinese, Uyghur
- Time zone: UTC+8 (China Standard (Note: Locals in Xinjiang frequently observe UTC+6 (Xinjiang Time), 2 hours behind Beijing.))
- Postal code: 841800
- Area code: 0966
- Website: loulan.gov.cn (in Chinese)

Ruoqiang County

Chinese name
- Simplified Chinese: 若羌县
- Traditional Chinese: 婼羌縣
Transcriptions
Standard Mandarin
- Hanyu Pinyin: Ruòqiāng Xiàn
- Wade–Giles: Jo⁴-chʻiang¹ Hsien⁴

Alternative Chinese name
- Simplified Chinese: 卡克里克县
- Traditional Chinese: 卡克里克縣
Transcriptions
Standard Mandarin
- Hanyu Pinyin: Qiǎkèlǐkè Xiàn

Uyghur name
- Uyghur: چاقىلىق ناھىيىسى
- Literal meaning: named after the town of Charklik
Transcriptions
- Latin Yëziqi: Chaqiliq Nahiyisi
- Yengi Yeziⱪ: Qaⱪiliⱪ Naⱨiyisi
- SASM/GNC: Qak̂ilik̂ Naĥiyisi
- Siril Yëziqi: Чақилиқ Наһийиси

Ruoqiang County (Chinese: 若羌县) as the official romanized name, also transliterated from Uyghur as Qakilik County (Uyghur: چاقىلىق ناھىيىسى; Chinese: 卡克里克县), is a county in the Xinjiang Uyghur Autonomous Region, China under the administration of the Bayingolin Mongol Autonomous Prefecture. It covers an area of 198,318 square kilometres (76,571 sq mi) (about twice the size of Zhejiang province and similar to Kyrgyzstan or Senegal), making it the largest county-level division in the country.

The county seat is in Ruoqiang Town. This is the location which less-detailed maps will label as "Ruoqiang". It lies at an altitude of 848 metres (2,782 ft).

== History ==
The ancient settlement of Charklik was located in what is today Ruoqiang County.

The Charkhlik Revolt took place here in 1935 when Uyghurs revolted against the Hui-dominated Tunganistan, which was controlled by the 36th Division (National Revolutionary Army). The Uyghurs were defeated.

The county was established in 1902 as 婼羌 (Ruòqiāng, "recalcitrant Qiang"). In 1959, the less-offensive written form of "若羌" ("like the Qiang") was adopted. The Uyghur name of the county, "Çakilik", is transliterated in Chinese as "卡克里克" (Qiǎkèlǐkè).

On July 24, 2015, Tieganlike was changed from a township to a town.

== Geography ==
Ruoqiang County ranges in latitude from 36° 00' to 41° 23' N and in longitude from 86° 45 to 93° 45' E. It borders Qiemo County to the west, Yuli County, Piqan County, and Kumul to the north, the provinces of Gansu and Qinghai to the east, and the Tibet Autonomous Region to the south.

The populated areas are located mostly along the northern foothills of the Altyn-Tagh mountain range. North of this strip of irrigated agricultural settlement is the Taklamakan Desert, south, the Altyn-Tagh and Kunlun Mountains.

The well known Lop Lake, these days usually dry, is located in the northeastern part of the county - the section officially known as Luobu Po Town (罗布泊镇), i.e., Lop Lake Town.

The southern part of the county (administratively, Qimantag Township (祁曼塔格乡)), is mountainous. The highest point in Qinghai, Bukadaban Feng, is located on the border of Qinghai and Ruoqiang County. The high plateau between the Altyn-Tagh and the main Kunlun range (which includes the Ulugh Muztagh) is known as the Kumkol Basin: an endorheic basin, where several saline lakes are found. Part of Altun Shan National Nature Reserve is located in Qimantag Township, in southern Ruoqiang County.

The three main lakes in the Kumkol Basin are Lake Aqqikkol (also known as Achak-kum; 阿其克库勒湖; 37°05′N 88°25′E, 4,250 m (13,940 ft) elevation), Lake Ayakum (阿牙克库木湖); 37°30′N 89°30′E; elevation 3,876 m (12,717 ft)), and Lake Jingyu (36°21′N 89°24′E, 260 km^{2} (100 sq mi), 4,708 m (15,446 ft) elevation). These lakes are among the few noticeable bodies of water in this extremely arid area; the area around them is officially protected as the Altun Shan Nature Reserve.

=== Climate ===
Ruoqiang has a cold desert climate (Köppen climate classification BWk) with extreme seasonal variation in temperature. The monthly 24-hour average temperature ranges from −7.4 °C (18.7 °F) in January to 27.5 °C (81.5 °F), and the annual mean is 11.7 °C (53.1 °F). Precipitation totals only 29 millimetres (1.1 in) annually, and mostly falls in summer. With monthly percent possible sunshine ranging from 63% in March to 82% in October, the area receives close to 3,100 hours of bright sunshine annually.

Climate data for Ruoqiang, elevation 888 m (2,913 ft), (1991–2020 normals, extremes 1991–present)
Month	Jan	Feb	Mar	Apr	May	Jun	Jul	Aug	Sep	Oct	Nov	Dec	Year
Record high °C (°F)	11.1 (52.0)	19.1 (66.4)	32.0 (89.6)	40.1 (104.2)	41.4 (106.5)	42.1 (107.8)	43.9 (111.0)	42.7 (108.9)	39.6 (103.3)	33.2 (91.8)	24.1 (75.4)	17.5 (63.5)	43.9 (111.0)
Mean daily maximum °C (°F)	−0.6 (30.9)	6.9 (44.4)	16.8 (62.2)	25.2 (77.4)	30.3 (86.5)	34.5 (94.1)	36.3 (97.3)	34.9 (94.8)	29.9 (85.8)	21.6 (70.9)	10.8 (51.4)	1.0 (33.8)	20.6 (69.1)
Daily mean °C (°F)	−7.5 (18.5)	−0.9 (30.4)	8.2 (46.8)	16.4 (61.5)	21.4 (70.5)	26.1 (79.0)	27.9 (82.2)	26.0 (78.8)	19.8 (67.6)	10.9 (51.6)	2.2 (36.0)	−5.7 (21.7)	12.1 (53.7)
Mean daily minimum °C (°F)	−13.0 (8.6)	−7.4 (18.7)	0.3 (32.5)	8.0 (46.4)	12.6 (54.7)	17.6 (63.7)	19.7 (67.5)	17.7 (63.9)	11.6 (52.9)	3.2 (37.8)	−3.7 (25.3)	−10.6 (12.9)	4.7 (40.4)
Record low °C (°F)	−22.6 (−8.7)	−20.3 (−4.5)	−10.7 (12.7)	−3.9 (25.0)	1.8 (35.2)	6.4 (43.5)	11.4 (52.5)	6.9 (44.4)	−1.8 (28.8)	−6.0 (21.2)	−14.0 (6.8)	−21.3 (−6.3)	−22.6 (−8.7)
Average precipitation mm (inches)	1.3 (0.05)	0.5 (0.02)	0.6 (0.02)	1.0 (0.04)	3.3 (0.13)	8.2 (0.32)	9.5 (0.37)	6.4 (0.25)	1.2 (0.05)	0.4 (0.02)	0.6 (0.02)	1.5 (0.06)	34.5 (1.35)
Average precipitation days (≥ 0.1 mm)	1.4	0.4	0.4	0.7	1.5	3.1	2.6	1.3	0.6	0.2	0.4	1.3	13.9
Average snowy days	3.2	1.0	0.2	0.1	0	0	0	0	0	0	0.5	3.2	8.2
Average relative humidity (%)	58	43	29	26	31	36	40	42	45	48	51	60	42
Mean monthly sunshine hours	190.7	192.0	232.5	253.5	284.5	283.2	280.9	279.3	278.1	274.8	219.4	180.2	2,949.1
Percentage possible sunshine	63	62	62	63	64	64	63	67	76	81	74	62	67
Source: China Meteorological Administration

== Administrative divisions ==
The county is made up of five towns, three townships and other areas:

Name	Simplified Chinese	Hanyu Pinyin	Uyghur (UEY)	Uyghur Latin (ULY)	Mongolian (traditional)	Mongolian (Cyrillic)	Administrative division code	Notes
Towns
Ruoqiang Town (Qakilik Town)	若羌镇	Ruòqiāng Zhèn	چاقىلىق بازىرى	chaqiliq baziri			652824100	
Yitimbulak Town (Yitunbulake, Yetimbulak)	依吞布拉克镇	Yītūnbùlākè Zhèn	يېتىمبۇلاق بازىرى	yëtimbulaq baziri			652824101	
Lopnur Town	罗布泊镇	Luóbùpō Zhèn	لوپنۇر كۆلى بازىرى (لوپكۆل بازىرى)	lopnur köli baziri (lopköl baziri)			652824102	
Waxxari Town	瓦石峡镇	Wǎshíxiá Zhèn	ۋاششەرى بازىرى	washsheri baziri			652824103	
Tikanlik Town	铁干里克镇	Tiěgànlǐkè Zhèn	تىكەنلىك بازىرى	tikenlik baziri			652824104	
Townships
Utam Township	吾塔木乡	Wútǎmù Xiāng	ئۇتام يېزىسى	Utam yëzisi			652824201	
Tomürlük Township	铁木里克乡	Tiěmùlǐkè Xiāng	تۆمۈرۈاك يېزىسى	tömürüak yëzisi			652824203	
Qimantag Township	祁曼塔格乡	Qímàntǎgé Xiāng	چىمەنتاغ يېزىسى	chimentagh yëzisi			652824204	

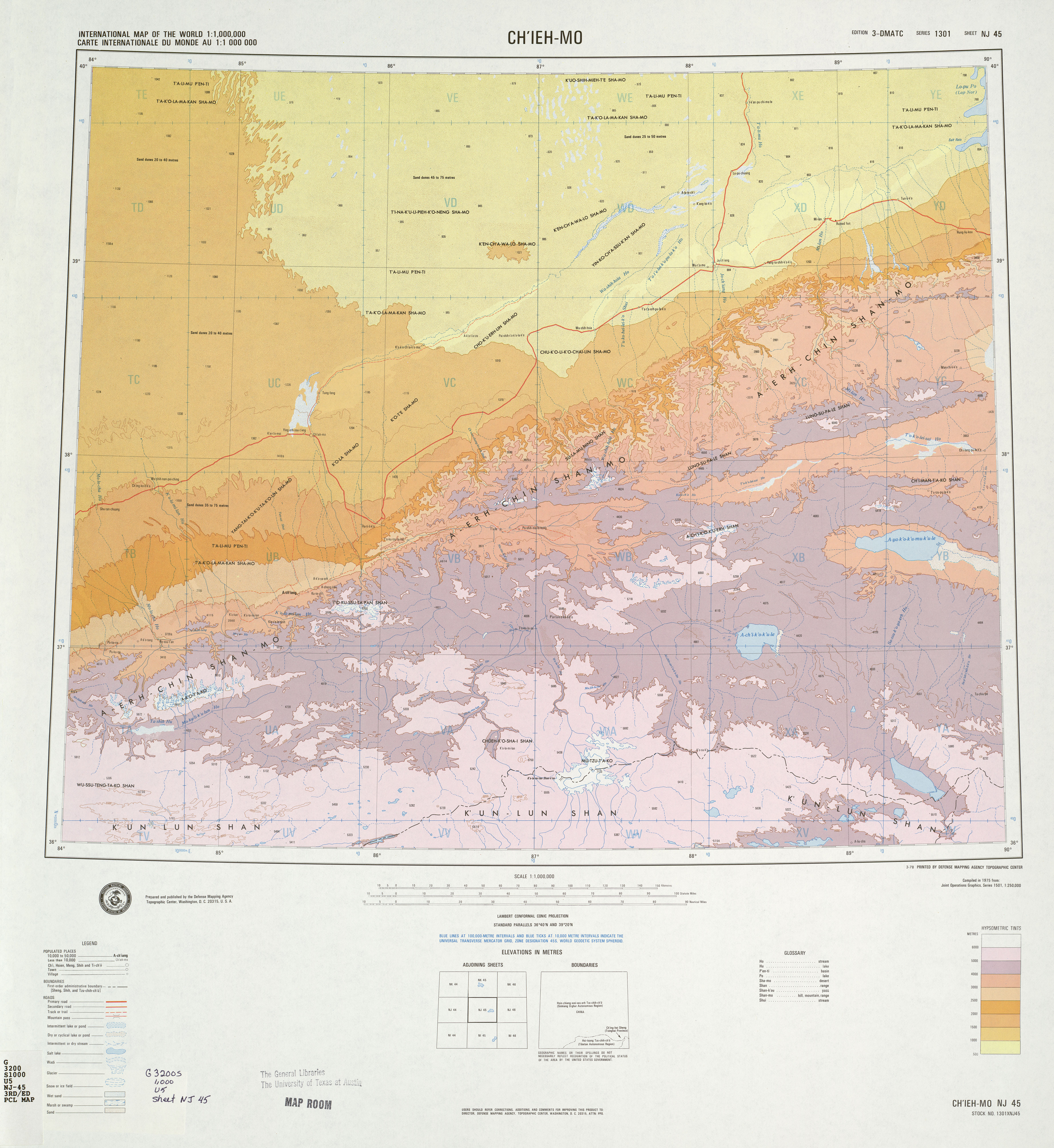
Map including the southern Ruoqiang County area from the International Map of the World (1975)

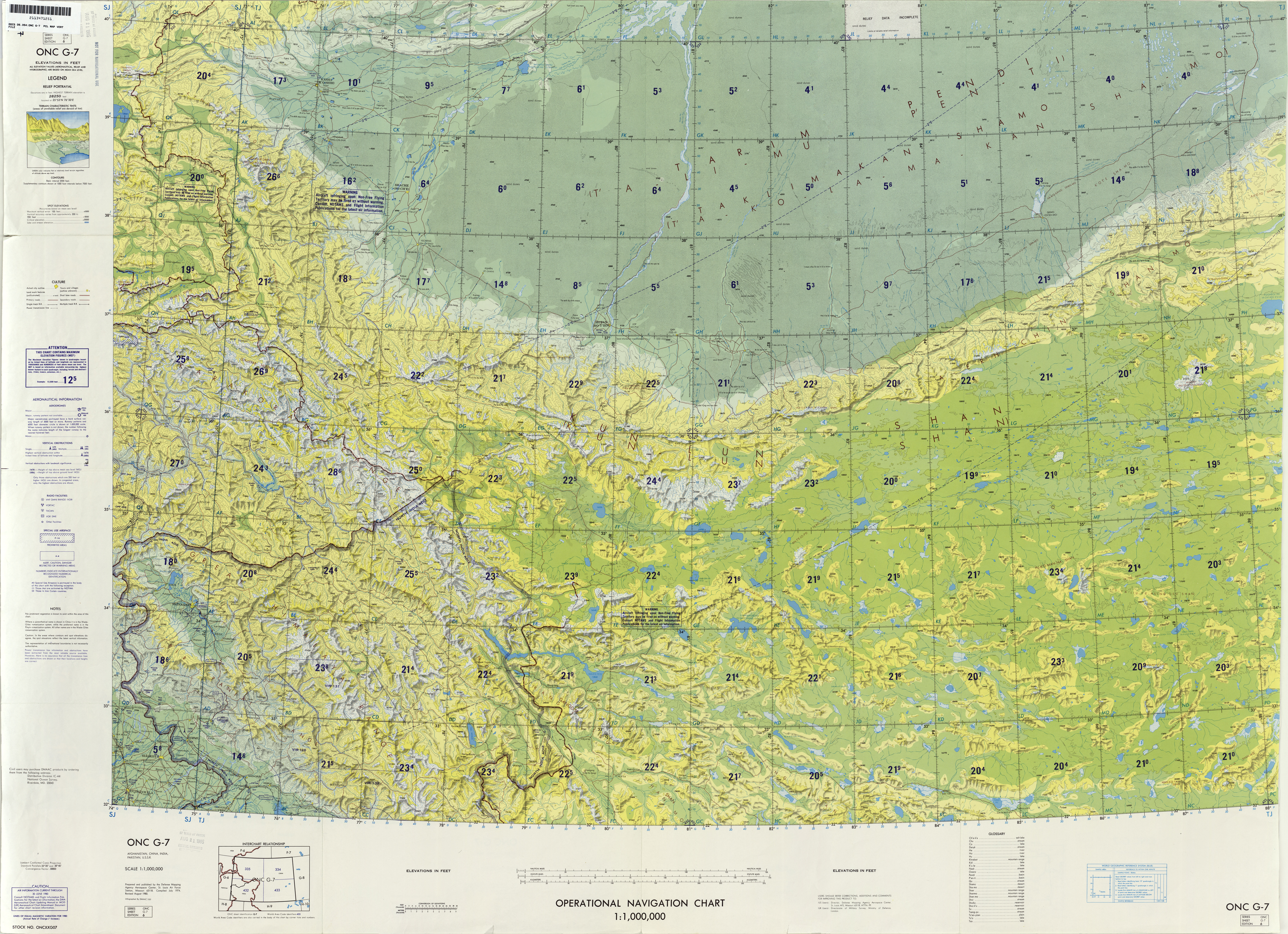
Map including Ruoqiang (labeled as Ruoqiang (Jo-ch'iang)) and surrounding region (DMA, 1980) (Note: From map: "The representation of international boundaries is not necessarily authoritative.")

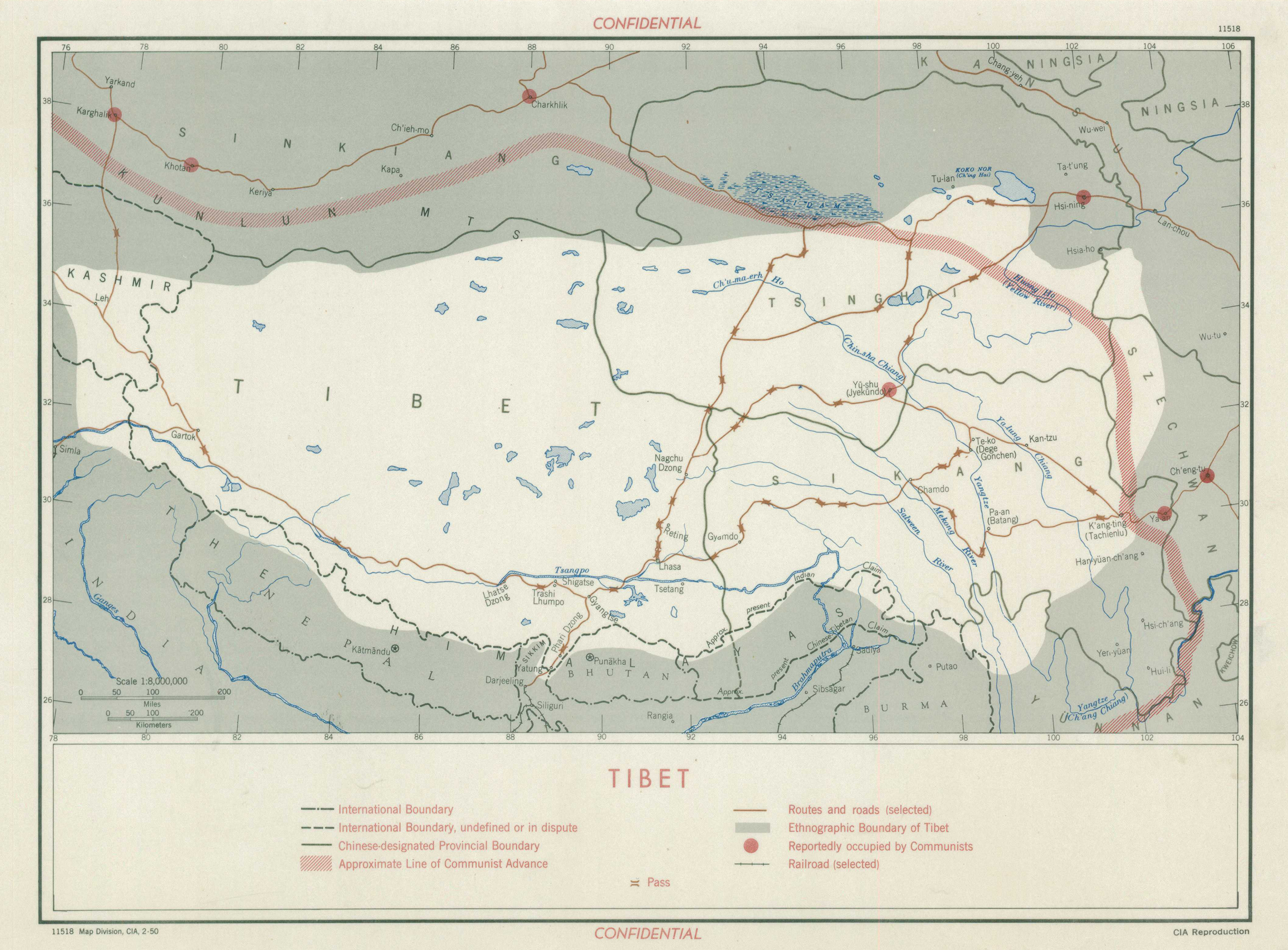
Map including Charkhlik (CIA, 1950)

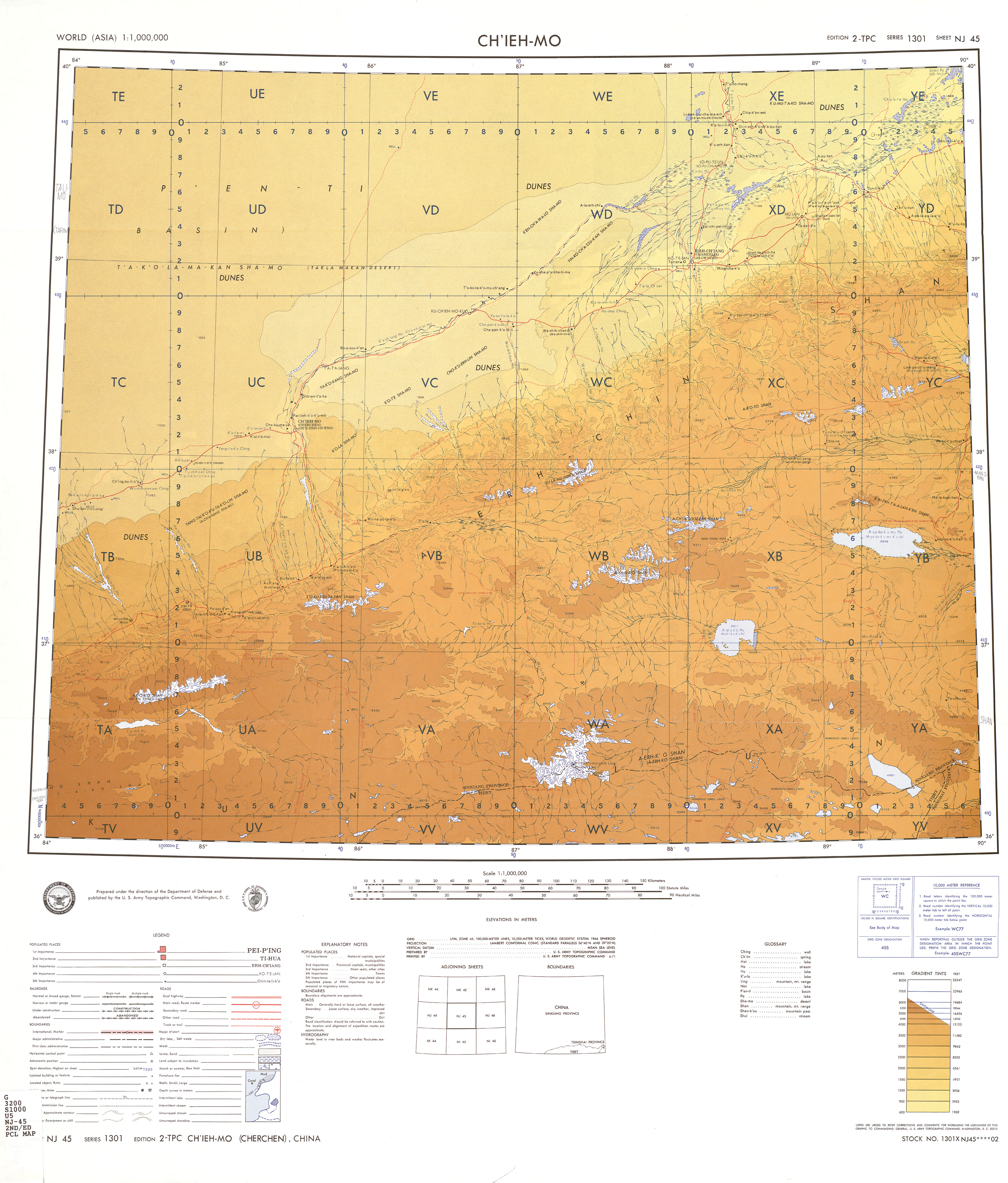
Map including Ruoqiang (labeled as ERH-CH'IANG (CHARKHLIK) (JO-CH'IANG)) (1971)

== Economy ==
As of 1885, there was about 2,740 acres (18,113 mu) of cultivated land in Qakilik.

== Demographics ==
As of 2015, 18,983 (55.8%) of the 34,020 residents of the county were Han Chinese, 13,328 (39.2%) were Uyghur and 1,709 were from other ethnic groups.

As of 2005, the county had a population of 31,877, of which 18,957 (59.5%) were of Han ethnicity, while Uyghurs numbered 11,761 (36.9%).

As of 1999, 58.72% of the population of the county was Han Chinese and 38.2% of the population was Uyghur.

As of 1997, several township-level divisions had a majority or plurality of Uyghur residents including Wutamu Township (62.3%), Tieganlike Township (61.3%), Ruoqiang Town (57.9%), and Waxxari (Washixia) Township (43.9%).

The proportion of nationalities in Ruoqiang (Qakilik) County, 2018
Nationality	Percentage
Han People	55.5%
Uyghurs	39.5%
Hui People	3.5%
Mongols	0.1%
Others	1.4%
Source of the population statistics :

== Transportation ==
=== Road ===
- China National Highway 218
- China National Highway 315
- G0612 Expressway connecting the county to Hotan and Kashgar to the West, and Golmud in Qinghai to the East
- G0711 Expressway connecting the county to Korla and Ürümqi to the North

=== Airport ===
- Ruoqiang Loulan Airport

=== Railway ===
- Golmud-Korla Railway
- Hotan–Ruoqiang railway (Chinese: 和若铁路) serves Ruoqiang with the latter as the terminus. Hotan–Ruoqiang also joins the Taklimakan Desert railway loop, together with sections of the Southern Xinjiang railway, Kashgar–Hotan railway, and Golmud–Korla railway, to form a railway link surrounding the Taklamakan Desert.

== See also ==
- Lop Nur
- Loulan Museum
