= Waxxari =

Waxxari 瓦石峡镇 (Chinese) Washixia, Wa-shih-hsia
- Town
- Location in Xinjiang Waxxari (China)
- Coordinates: 38°40′59″N 087°19′47″E
- Country: China
- Autonomous Region: Xinjiang
- Prefecture: Bayingolin
- County: Ruoqiang / Qakilik

Population (2010)
  - Total: 5,886

Ethnic groups
  - Major ethnic groups: Uyghur, Han Chinese
- Time zone: UTC+8 (China Standard)

Waxxari (Chinese: 瓦石峡镇) is a town in Ruoqiang / Qakilik County, Bayingolin Mongol Autonomous Prefecture, Xinjiang, China.

== Name ==
'Waxxari' means 'noisy city' in Uyghur. The Mandarin Chinese pinyin-derived name Washixia (Wade-Giles: Wa-shih-hsia) is derived from the sound of the Uyghur name, an abbreviation of Washixiehai'er (瓦石协海尔).

== History ==
In 1953, Waxxari Township (瓦石峡乡) was established.

In 1960, Waxxari Township became Waxxari Commune (瓦石峡公社).

In 1984, Waxxari Commune became Waxxari Township.

In 2012, Waxxari Township became Waxxari Town (瓦石峡镇).

== Geography ==
Waxxari is located 80 km (50 mi) southwest of the county seat, Ruoqiang Town. Waxxari is located on the Waxxari River (Waxxari He, Wa-shih-hsia Ho).

== Administrative divisions ==
Waxxari includes one residential community and five villages:

Residential community:

- Waxxari (Washixia; 瓦石峡社区)

Villages:

- Wudulewusitang (乌都勒吾斯塘村), Wutamu (Wutamucun; 吾塔木村) 38°41′12″N 087°21′41″E, Xinjian (新建村), Muye (牧业村), Tashisayi (塔什萨依村)

== Demographics ==
Historical population
| Year | Pop. | ±% p.a. |
|---|---|---|
| 2000 | 4,691 | — |
| 2010 | 5,886 | +2.30% |

As of 1997, the population of Waxxari was 43.9% Uyghur and 43.2% Han Chinese.

== Transportation ==
- China National Highway 315

== Historical maps ==
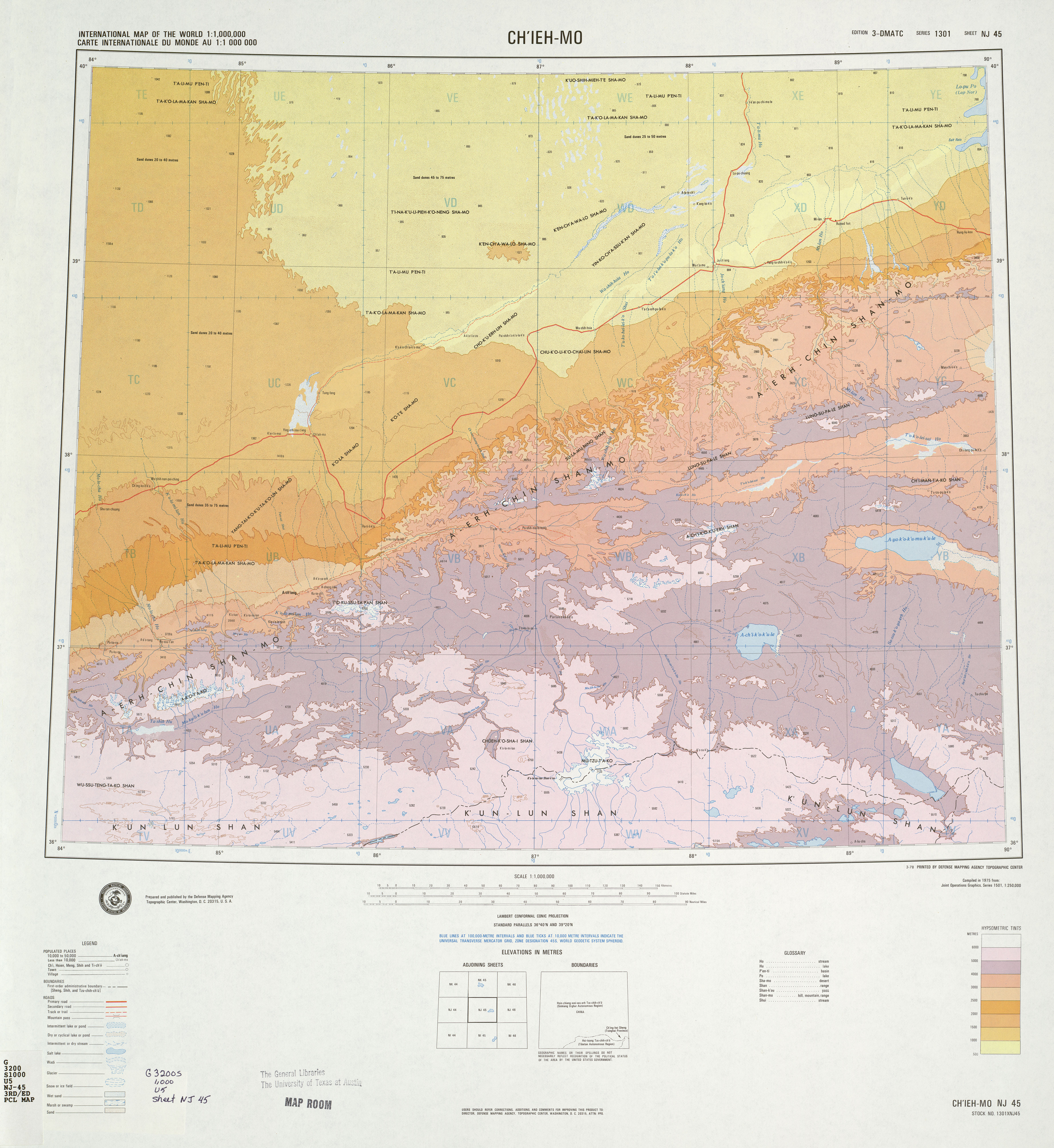
Map of Waxxari (labeled as Wa-shih-hsia) and surrounding area (DMA, 1975)

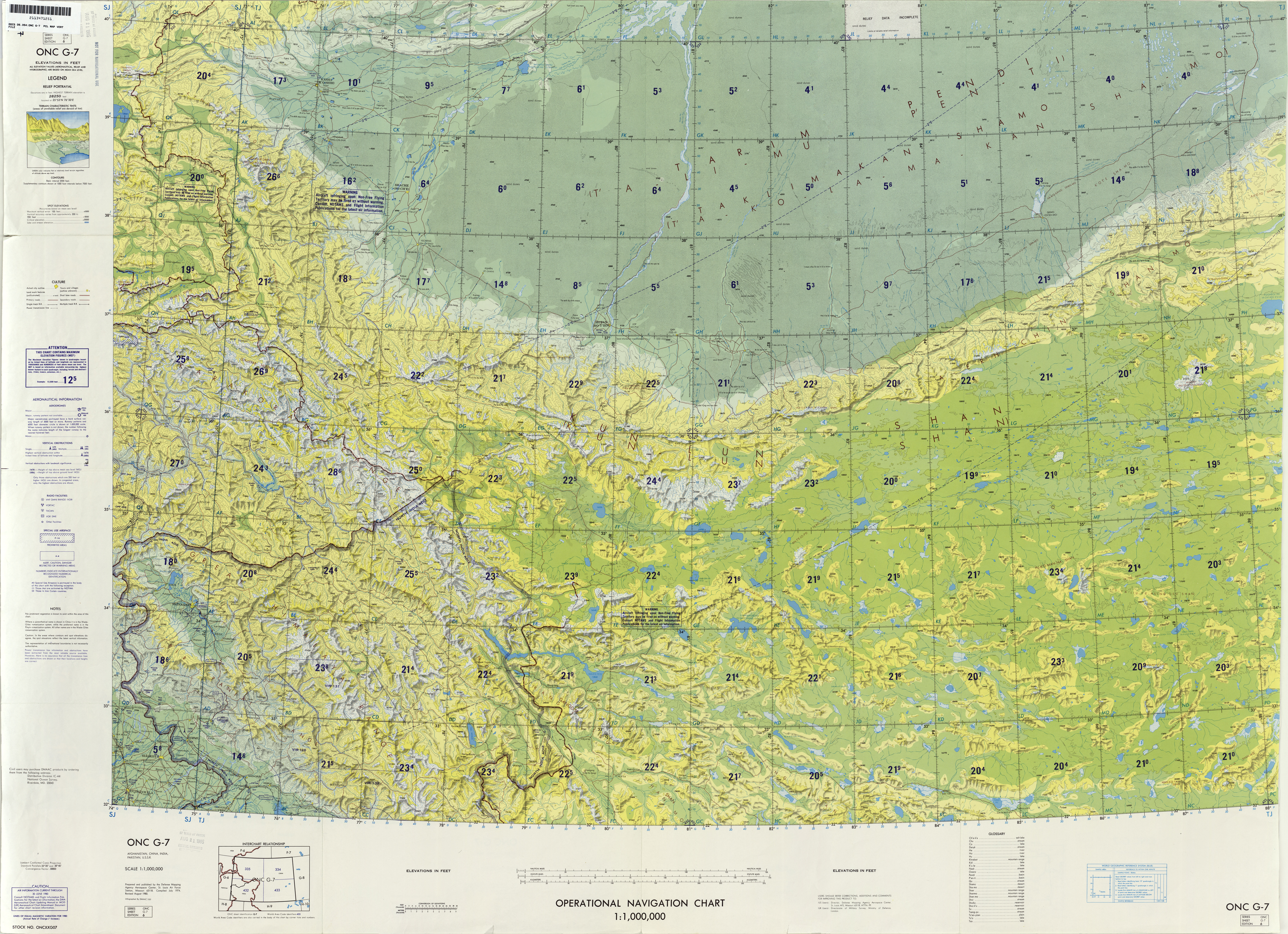
Map including Waxxari (Wa-shih-hsia) (DMA, 1980) (Note: From map: "The representation of international boundaries is not necessarily authoritative.")

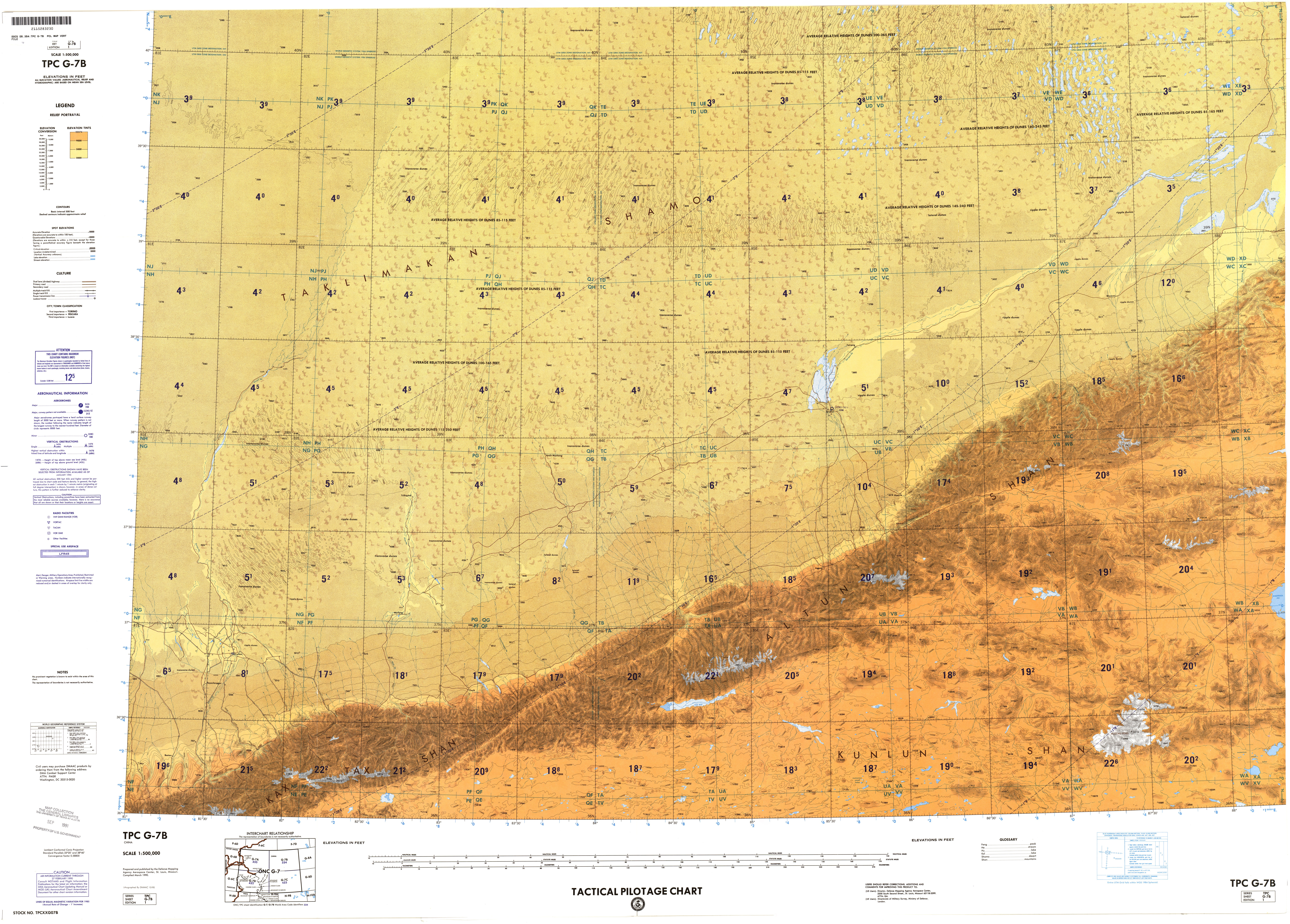
Map including Waxxari (DMA, 1990)

== See also ==
- List of township-level divisions of Xinjiang
