= Ulugh Muztagh =

Mountain in China

- Muztag Feng
- Location within Xinjiang Location within Tibet Location within China

Highest point
- Elevation: 6,973 m (22,877 ft)
- Prominence: 1,943 m (6,375 ft)
- Listing: Ultra
- Coordinates: 36°24′45″N 87°23′06″E

Geography
- Location: Xizang (Tibet) and Xinjiang, China
- Parent range: Kunlun Mountains

Climbing
- First ascent: 1985 by a Sino-American expedition, 2003 West summit by Finnish expedition

Ulugh Muztagh, Ulugh Muztag (Uyghur: ئۇلۇغ مۇزتاغ; simplified Chinese: 乌鲁木孜塔格; traditional Chinese: 烏魯木孜塔格; pinyin: Wūlǔ Mùzītǎgé) or Muztag Feng (Chinese: 木孜塔格峰; pinyin: Mùzītǎgé Fēng), is an extremely remote mountain group on the northern Qinghai-Tibetan Plateau. Located on the border between the Tibetan Autonomous Region and Xinjiang Uyghur Autonomous Region, it is part of the Kunlun Mountains of East-Central Asia.

== History ==
There have been only a few attempts to climb Ulugh Muztagh and several of them have not been even able to reach the foot of the mountain. Getting near the mountain requires a difficult drive across terrain at the elevation of 4300–5000 metres. Expeditions who have climbed the mountain spent 2 to 3 weeks on the approach alone using 4 or 6 wheel drive vehicles.

The 7,723 metre elevation claim was made by the English country gentleman and explorer George Littledale in 1895. Despite the fact that earlier explorers had put forward elevations several hundred metres lower, and the scientific 6,973 metre measurement made in 1985, the Littledale elevation has been so resilient that even into the 21st century it still remains the most widely quoted; it is found in generally reliable publications, including the Times Atlas and fact books.

Other remote Tibetan-related mountains whose elevations have been established by SRTM and modern Chinese mapping include:

- Nganglong (Aling) Kangri, 32°48′30″N 81°00′03″E, 6,720 m, but still often quoted at 7,315 m
- Amne Machin (Maqen Gangri), 34°47′54″N 99°27′45″E, 6,282 m, but still often quoted at 7,160 m
- Bukadaban Feng, 36°01′27″N 90°51′57″E, 6,860 m, but still quoted much higher
- Zangser Kangri, 34°23′39″N 85°51′00″E, 6,540 m, but still sometimes quoted at 6,940 m.

Northeast of Ulugh Muztagh an endorheic basin with several important lakes (Aqqikol, Ayakkum, Jingyu, etc.) is located. The basin is bounded by the main range of the Kunlun in the south, and by the more or less parallel range, the Altyn-Tagh, in the north. Much of the basin is officially protected as the Altun Shan Nature Reserve. There are volcanic and intrusive rocks in the area, the youngest volcanics are about 4 million years old.

== See also ==
- List of ultras of Tibet, East Asia and neighbouring areas
