= Ruoqiang Loulan Airport =

Ruoqiang Loulan Airport 若羌楼兰机场 چاقىلىق كروران ئايرودرومى
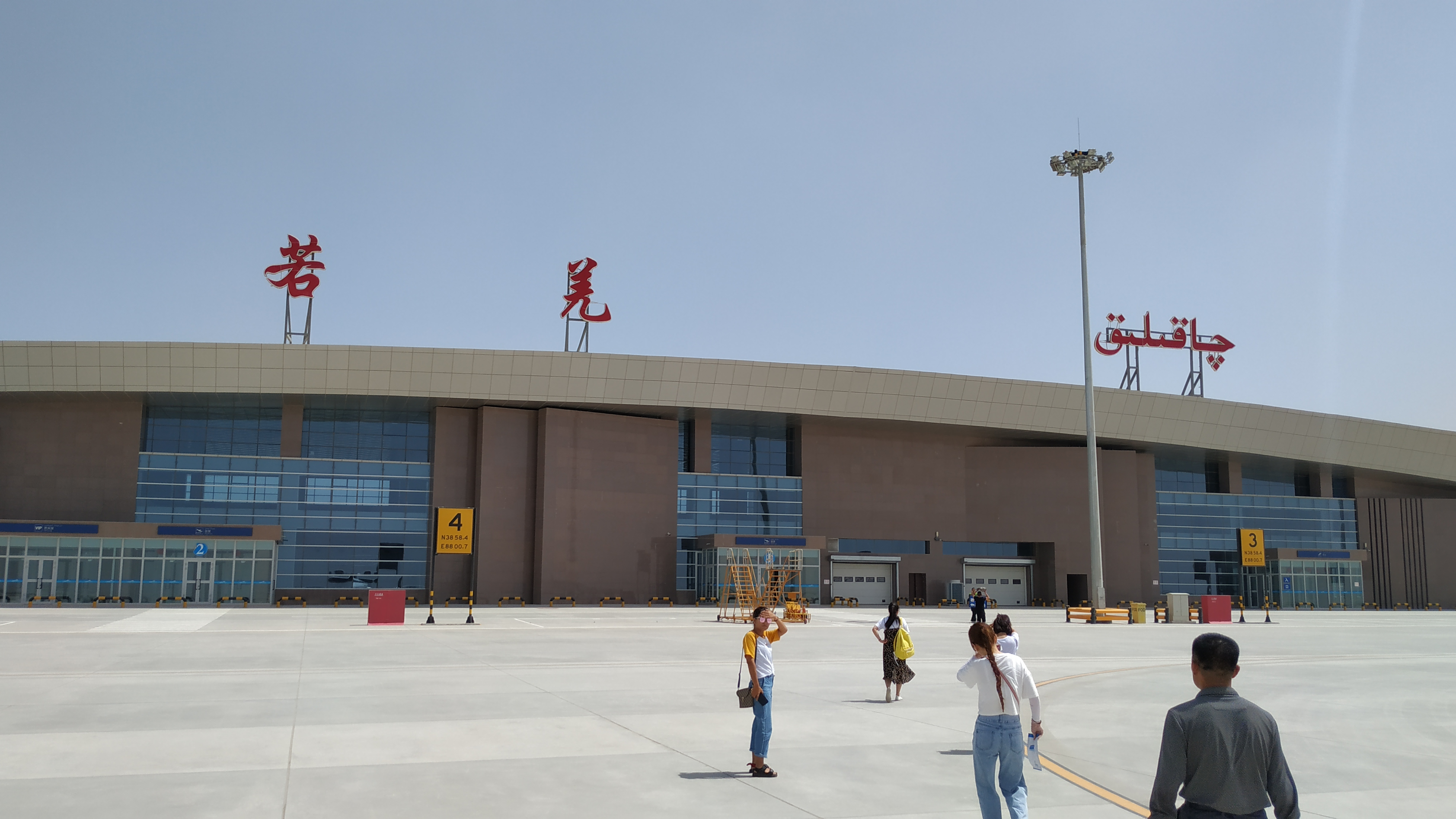
- IATA: RQA; ICAO: ZWRQ

Summary
- Airport type: Public
- Serves: Ruoqiang County, Xinjiang
- Location: Wutamu Township, Ruoqiang County
- Opened: 29 March 2018
- Elevation AMSL: 890 m / 2,920 ft
- Coordinates: 38°58′29″N 88°00′30″E

Map
- Location of airport in Xinjiang

Runways
Direction	Length		Surface
Direction	m	ft	Surface
04/22	2,800	9,186

Statistics (2021)
- Passengers: 145,943
- Aircraft movements: 2,480
- Cargo (metric tons): 12.8

Ruoqiang Loulan Airport
- Simplified Chinese: 若羌楼兰机场
- Traditional Chinese: 若羌樓蘭機場
Transcriptions
Standard Mandarin
- Hanyu Pinyin: Ruòqiāng Lóulán Jīchǎng

Ruoqiang Loulan Airport (IATA: RQA, ICAO: ZWRQ) is an airport serving Ruoqiang County in Bayingolin Mongol Autonomous Prefecture, Xinjiang, China. It received approval from the State Council of China and the Central Military Commission in March 2014. The airport is located in Xitatirang Village (西塔提让村), west of the county seat Ruoqiang Town. Construction began in November 2015, with an investment of 546 million yuan. The airport was opened on 29 March 2018, and became the 20th airport in Xinjiang.

== Facilities ==
The airport has a runway that is 2,800 metres (9,200 ft) and 45 metres (148 ft) (class 4C), and a 6,400-square-metre (69,000 sq ft) terminal building. It is projected to handle 120,000 passengers and 480 tons of cargo annually by 2020.

== Airlines and destinations ==
Airlines	Destinations
Chengdu Airlines	Hotan, Turpan
China Express Airlines	Korla, Qiemo
Tianjin Airlines	Chengdu-Tianfu, Korla, Ürümqi

== See also ==
- List of airports in China
- List of the busiest airports in China
