= Lake Aqqikkol =

Saline lake in Xinjiang China

Lake Aqqikkol, Aqqikkol Lake, Aqqikkol Hu
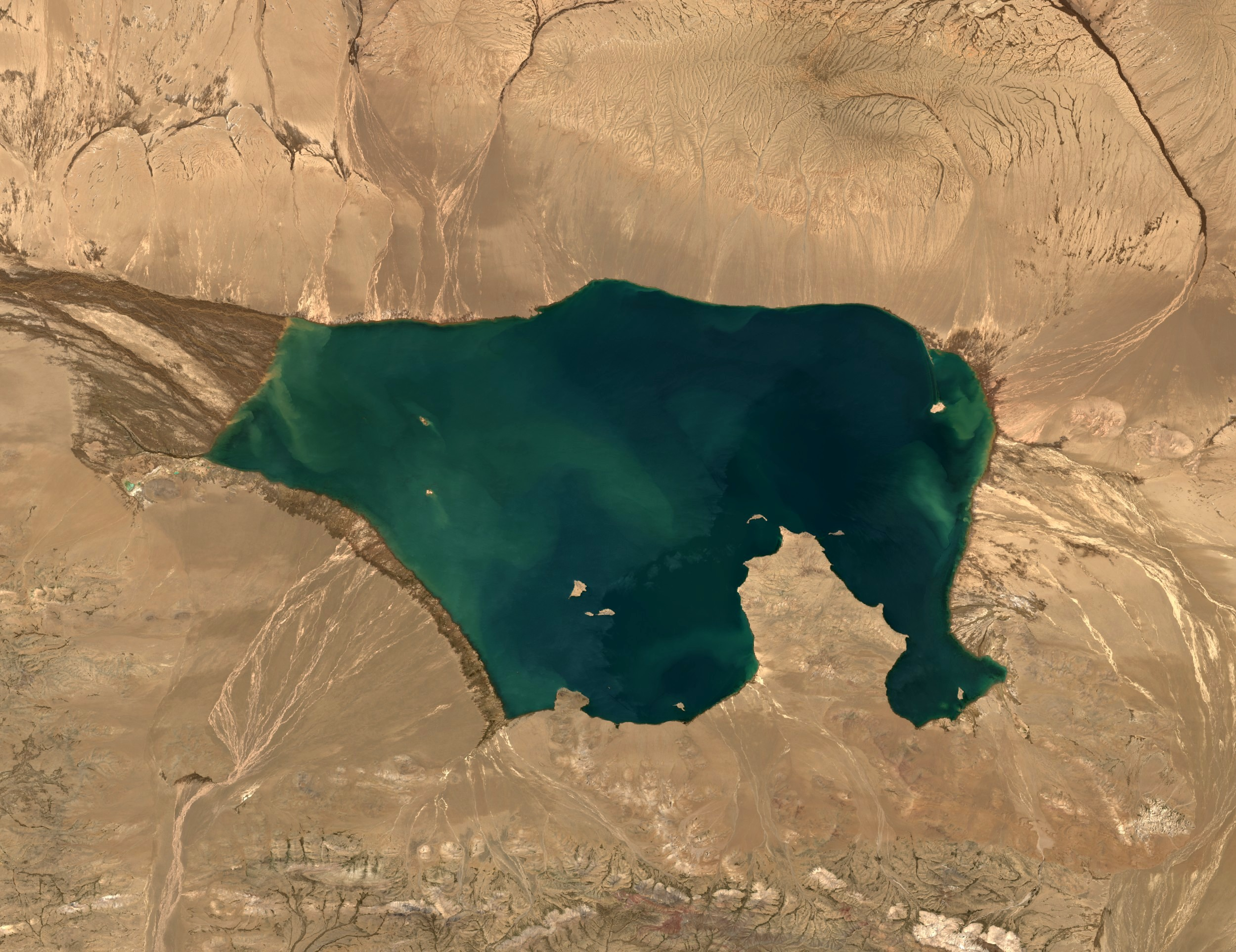

- Location within Bayingolin
- Location: Xinjiang
- Coordinates: 37°05′N 88°25′E
- Type: Saline
- Islands: 2

Location within China

Lake Aqqikkol is a saline lake in Xinjiang, China. The lake falls within the borders of Ruoqiang County, and is noted as being a gathering place for local and migratory birds.
