= Qimantag Township =

Township in Xinjiang, China

Qimantag Township 祁曼塔格乡
- Township
- Location in Xinjiang
- Country: China
- Autonomous region: Xinjiang
- Autonomous prefecture: Bayingolin Mongol Autonomous Prefecture
- County: Ruoqiang County
- Township seat: Qimantag Village

Area
  - Total: 65,600 km^{2} (25,300 sq mi)
- Time zone: UTC+8 (China Standard Time)
- Area code: 0996

Qimantag Township (Chinese: 祁曼塔格乡; pinyin: Qímàntǎgé Xiāng) is a township in Ruoqiang County, Bayingolin Mongol Autonomous Prefecture, Xinjiang, China. It is located in the southeastern part of Ruoqiang County, on the Qiangtang Plateau, between the eastern Kunlun Mountains and the Qimantag Mountains. With an area of about 65,600 square kilometres, Qimantag Township is known the largest township-level divisions in China by area. It is one of the most sparsely settled areas in China.

== Name ==
According to the Ruoqiang County government, the name Qimantag is derived from Uyghur and means "flower-and-grass mountain". The township is named for its position on the southern side of the Qimantag Mountains.

== History ==
The area was historically associated with pastoral administration in the southern mountains of Ruoqiang County. In 1909, Qumang Township was established in Ruoqiang County and administered pastoral areas including Yixiekepati and Tiemulike. In 1981, the Yixiekepati and Kaladun pastoral production brigades were established. Qimantag Township was created in November 1983 under Qiman District, and became a county-administered township after Qiman District was abolished in March 2005.

== Geography ==
Qimantag Township lies in the high plateau and mountain region of southeastern Ruoqiang County. County government sources describe it as being on the Qiangtang Plateau, between the East Kunlun and Qimantag mountain ranges. A local China News Service report stated that the township government seat is at an elevation of about 4,000 metres, more than 500 kilometres from Ruoqiang county seat, and that the township overlaps with the Altun Shan National Nature Reserve.

The broader Ruoqiang County government describes the county as lying in southeastern Bayingolin, at the southeastern edge of the Taklamakan Desert, with the Kunlun and Altun mountain systems in its south and southeast. The nearby Altun Shan National Nature Reserve covers about 45,000 square kilometres in southeastern Bayingolin, within Ruoqiang and Qiemo counties, and has an average elevation of about 4,580 metres.

== Administrative divisions ==
Qimantag Township is administered by Ruoqiang County. The township seat is Qimantag Village, and the township has two village-level divisions: Qimantag Village and Kalagoka Village. The Bayingolin prefectural government also lists Qimantag Township as one of the three townships under Ruoqiang County, together with Wutamu Township and Tiemulike Township.

== Economy and transport ==
County government sources describe Qimantag as a pastoral township and one of Ruoqiang County's pastoral bases. The township has rural roads linking it with Yitunbulak Town, Qinghai and mountain areas within its territory. Because much of the area overlaps with protected highland ecosystems, local work also includes ecological protection, patrols against illegal hunting, illegal mining and unauthorized crossings in the reserve area.

== Conservation ==
Qimantag Township is closely associated with the Altun Shan National Nature Reserve. In 2023, the township government and the Yixiekepati management station were the only human settlement in the reserve, and that 113 households with 407 people from Qimantag Township had been relocated from the mountains to the county town area as part of grazing-withdrawal and grassland-restoration policies. The same report described the reserve as supporting more than 300 species of wild animals, including Tibetan antelope, wild yak and kiang.

== See also ==
- Ruoqiang County
- Altun Shan National Nature Reserve
- Qimantag Mountains
- Kunlun Mountains
