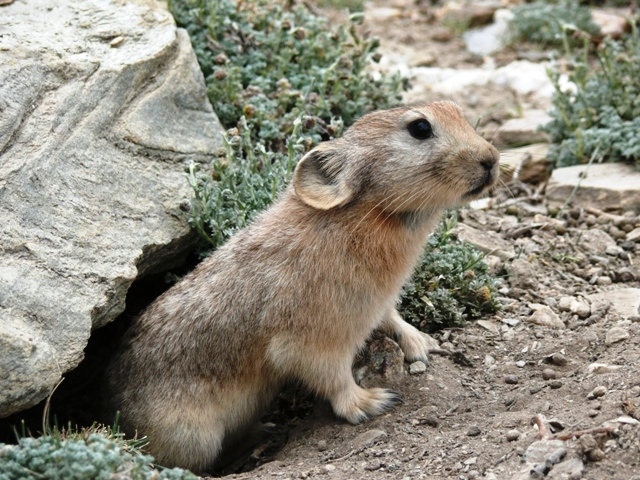
- at 5000 m near Tang Lang La

Conservation status
- Least Concern (IUCN 3.1)

Scientific classification
- Kingdom: Animalia
- Phylum: Chordata
- Class: Mammalia
- Order: Lagomorpha
- Family: Ochotonidae
- Genus: Ochotona
- Species: O. ladacensis

Binomial name
- Ochotona ladacensis (Günther, 1875)
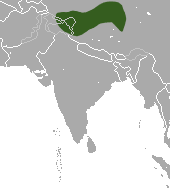
- Ladak pika range

= Ladak pika =

Species of mammal

The Ladak pika (Ochotona ladacensis), also known as the Ladakh pika, is a species of mammal in the family Ochotonidae found in China, India, and Pakistan. Prior to identification as a separate species, specimens were thought to be of the plateau pika. Named for the Ladakh region, they are commonly found in valleys of the mountain ranges spanning from Pakistan through India to China at an elevation between 4,300 and 5,450 m (14,110 and 17,880 ft) and are herbivores.

== Taxonomy ==
Specimens of the Ladak pika were originally identified as plateau pika due to their color and the similarities in the narrow interorbital region on the skull of each species. However, differences were found between the two including the smaller auditory bulla found in the Ladak pika and a differently arched skull shape. There are no subspecies of the Ladak pika. Local names in the Ladakhi language include zabra, karin, and phisekarin.

== Description ==
The fur of the Ladak pika is a light brown/grey with a yellow/white underside. The length of the body of an adult specimen measures between 7 and 9 inches (18 and 23 cm). The outside areas of the ears are a color reminiscent of rust. The skull has a high arch. They reproduce during late June and early July.

== Habitat ==
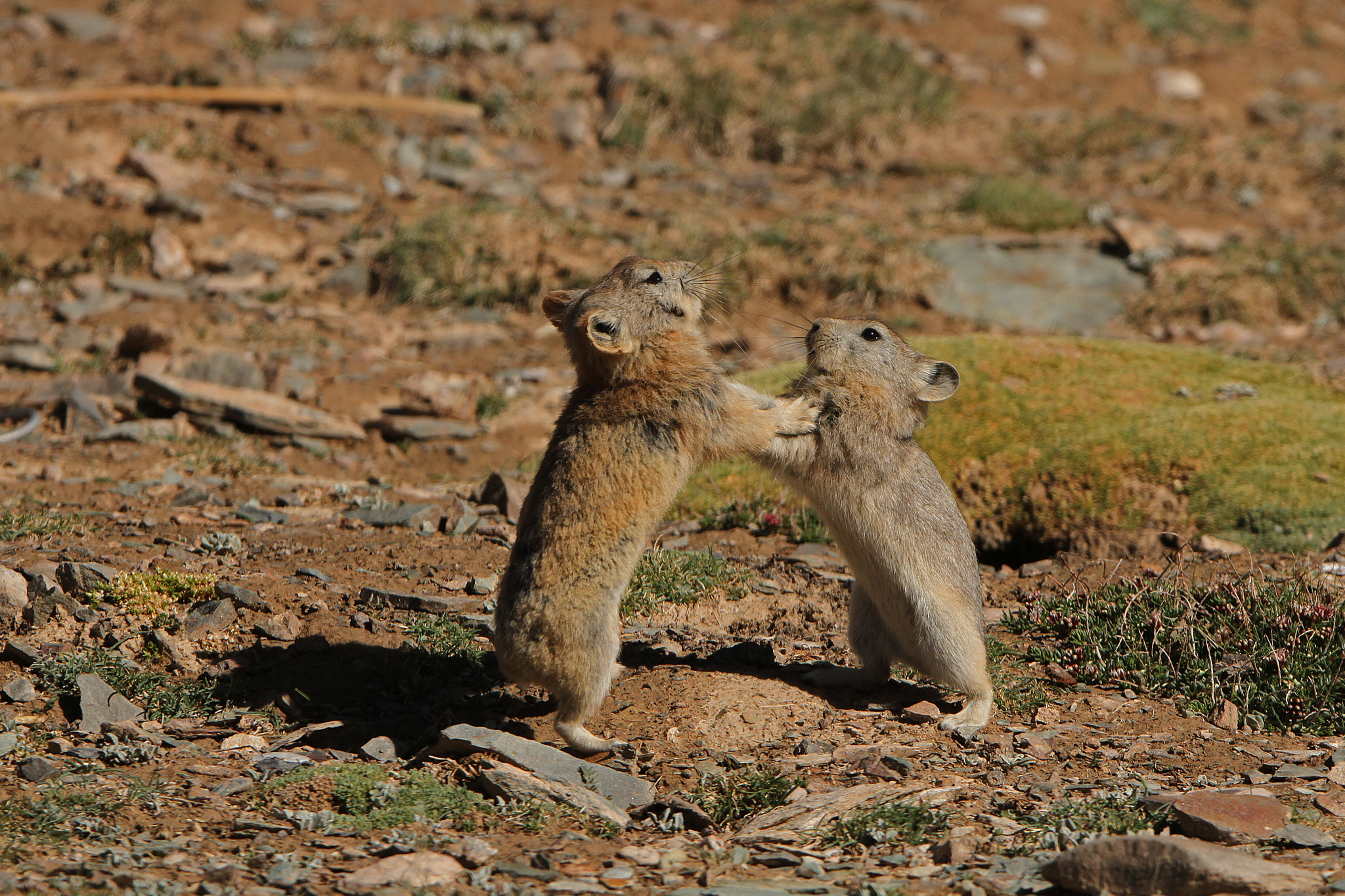
Ladak pikas fighting

The Ladak pika is found in the mountain ranges of northern India, northeastern Pakistan, and western China including the provinces of Qinghai, Tibet and Xinjiang, as well as across the Tibetan Plateau. They inhabit valleys at elevations between 4,300 and 5,450 metres (14,110 and 17,880 ft), and dig burrows. They are herbivorous and are thought to eat roots throughout the winter such as those of the family Primulaceae. The Ladak pika lives in territorial family groups. They have been recorded as being commonly found during surveys in these regions.
