= Charklik (ancient settlement) =

Archeological site in Ruoqiang County, Xinjiang

- Location within Bayingolin
- 39°02′N 88°00′E
- Location: Ruoqiang County, Xinjiang, China
- Region: Tarim Basin

Charklik or Charkhlik (Chinese: 卡克里克) is an archaeological site named after the town of Charkhlik (Qakilik), in Ruoqiang (Qakilik) County, Xinjiang Uyghur Autonomous Region of the People's Republic of China. Together with the nearby Miran site, they correspond to two ancient capitals of Shanshan, Wuni (扜泥, OC:*‍*__ C.nˤ[əj]/qʰʷa niːl) and Yixun (伊循, OC:*‍*ʔij sə.lu[n]/*qlil ljun). However, it is as yet unclear which site correspond to which capital.

== History ==
Charklik was the name for an ancient settlement of the kingdom of Kroraina (Chinese: Loulan; later Shanshan) from at least as far back as the 1st century BCE.

During the latter part of the Former Han and throughout the Later Han the capital of the kingdom of Shanshan was known as Yüni (扜泥), thought to have been located near the present town of Ruoqiang at Charklik.

The explorer and archaeologist Aurel Stein visited the small oasis of Charklik in 1906, where he found a little village that was the official headquarters of a very large district, almost entirely desert, and which included the salt lake known as Lop Nor. The district contained only about five hundred households, even including the semi-nomadic herders and fishermen called 'Lopliks'.

The Buddhist monk Xuanzang passed through a town called Na-Fu-Bo (纳缚波) on his way home to China in 645 CE, and Marco Polo in the 13th century passed through a place he called the town of Lop, Both of these were suggested by Aurel Stein to be Charklik. Stein wrote that there was "conclusive evidence" that Charklik was already the chief centre of the region when Xuanzang passed through it.

== Description ==
At various times in history Charklik was the last stop on the difficult Southern Silk Road from Khotan before it crossed the much-feared salt pans of Lop Nor to Dunhuang. An alternate route from modern Charklik heads south through the Qaidam Desert then turns northeast to Dunhuang, or south to Lhasa. There is also an ancient route leading north across the Taklamakan Desert to Korla. Northeast of the town of Ruoqiang is the important archaeological site of Miran.

The modern town of Ruoqiang is described as "small, busy place" with only very basic accommodation available. It is a convenient jumping-off place to visit the ruins of Miran.

South of Charklik are the imposing Altun Mountains where at a large nature reserve the wild horse, Przewalski's horse (Equus przewalski), now extinct in the wild, is being reintroduced from stocks bred in zoos.

== See also ==
- Tarim mummies
- Loulan Kingdom
- Miran
