= Lake Ayakkum =

Lake in China

Ayake Kumu, Ayakkum, Ayakum
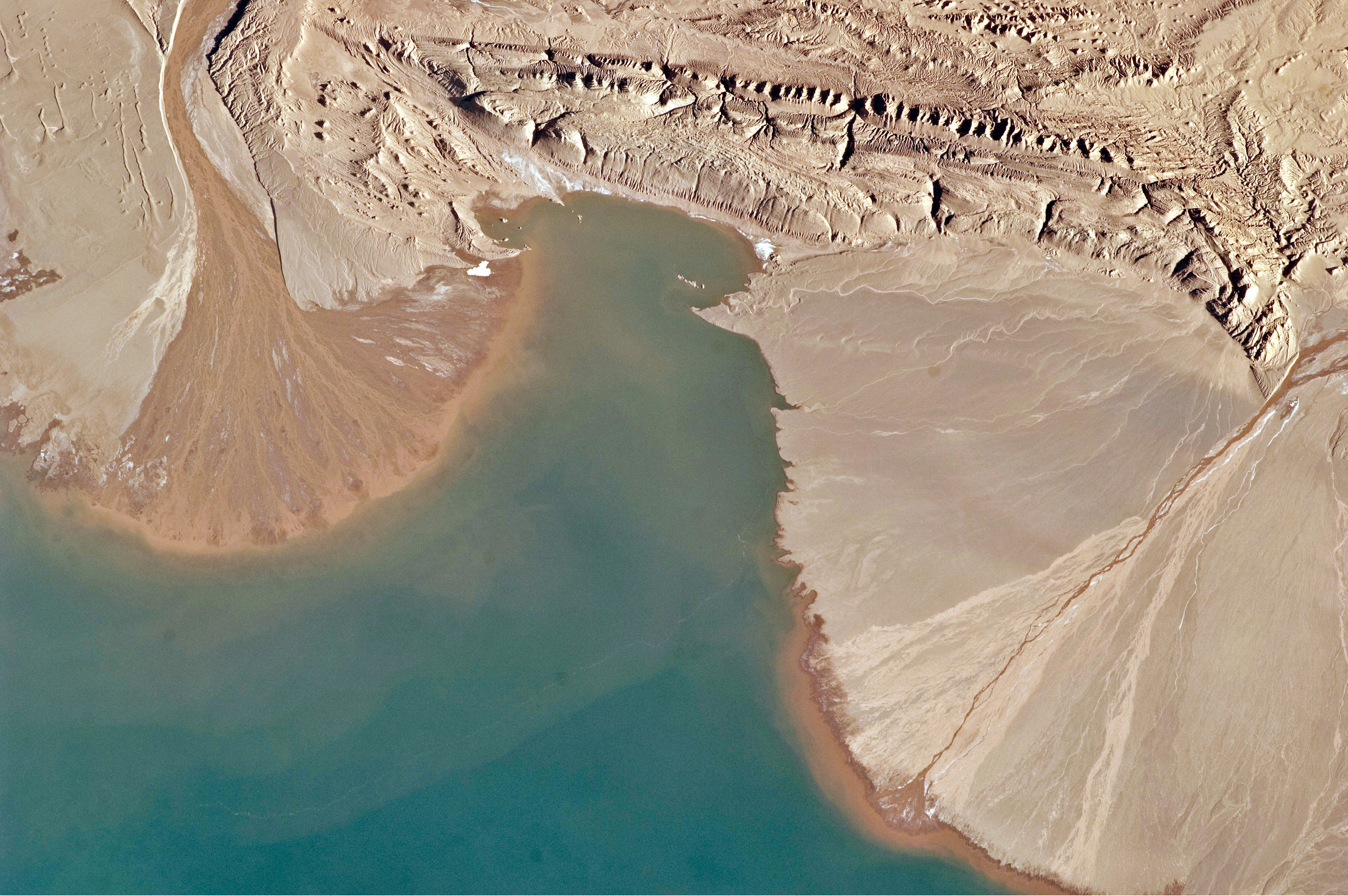
- Astronaut photograph highlighting two river deltas formed along Lake Ayakkum's south-western shoreline

- Location within Bayingolin Location within China
- Location: Xinjiang
- Coordinates: 37°33′N 89°23′E

Ayakkum Lake (Chinese: 阿雅克库木湖; Uyghur: ئاياققۇم كۆلى) is a lake near the northern boundary of the Tibetan Plateau, to the southeast of the Kunlun Mountains. While many of the small glacier and snowmelt-fed streams on the Plateau give rise to major South-east Asian rivers (including the Mekong and Yangtze), some empty into saline lakes such as Lake Ayakkum. The lake is growing because of increased flows from small glacier- and snowmelt-fed streams.
