= Ruoqiang Town =

Ruoqiang چاقىلىق 若羌镇 Charklik, Qakilik, Jo-ch'iang
- Town
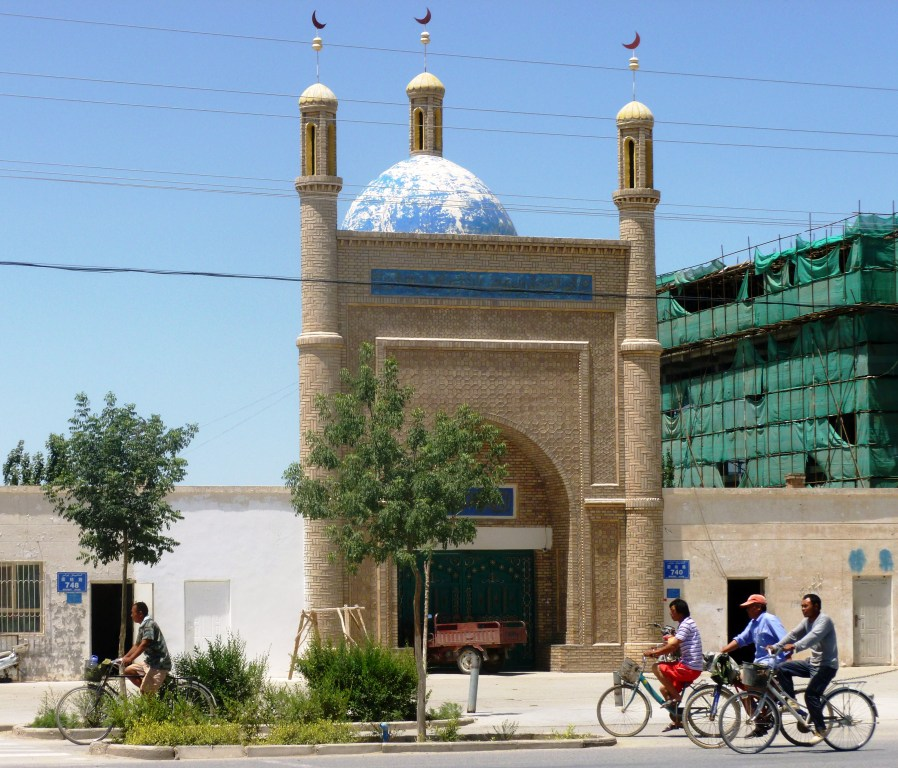
- A mosque in Ruoqiang

- Location in Xinjiang Ruoqiang (Bayingolin)
- Coordinates: 39°01′05″N 88°10′05″E
- Country: China
- Region: Xinjiang
- Prefecture: Bayingolin Mongol Autonomous Prefecture
- County: Ruoqiang

Area
  - Total: 5.6 km^{2} (2.2 sq mi)
- Elevation: 897 m (2,943 ft)

Population (2010)
  - Total: 9,872
  - Density: 1,800/km^{2} (4,600/sq mi)
- Time zone: UTC+8 (China Standard)
- Postal code: 841800
- Telephone area code: 0966

Ruoqiang Town (Chinese: 若羌; pinyin: Ruòqiāng; Uyghur: Чакилик: Qakilik or Charklik) is a town in Ruoqiang County, Bayin'gholin Mongol Autonomous Prefecture in southeastern Xinjiang, People's Republic of China. Ruoqiang Town is the county seat of the Ruoqiang County, and therefore is the place that less detailed maps label as "Ruoqiang County" or just "Ruoqiang". The postal code is 841 800.

There is a two-laned asphalt highway to Korla, 490 km (304 mi) north, and 956 km (594 mi) west to Hotan. There is no motorable road east to Dunhuang in Gansu, but one can now drive southeast through the Altun Shan range and then north through part of the Tsaidam to Dunhuang.

== Names ==
Lionel Giles has recorded the following names for Ruoqiang Town (with his Wade-Giles forms of the Chinese names converted to pinyin):

"Yixun, or Yixiu, capital of Shanshan after 77 B.C. (Note: This is an incorrect identification, the capital's name was, in fact, Yüni 扜泥.)
Shanshan Zhen [Sui].
Nafubo (纳缚波) [Xuanzang].
Dianhe [Tang].
Shicheng Zhen [Tang after A.D. 675].
Great Nob [Tibetan records].
City of Lop [Marco Polo]
Charkhlik [modern name]."

== History ==
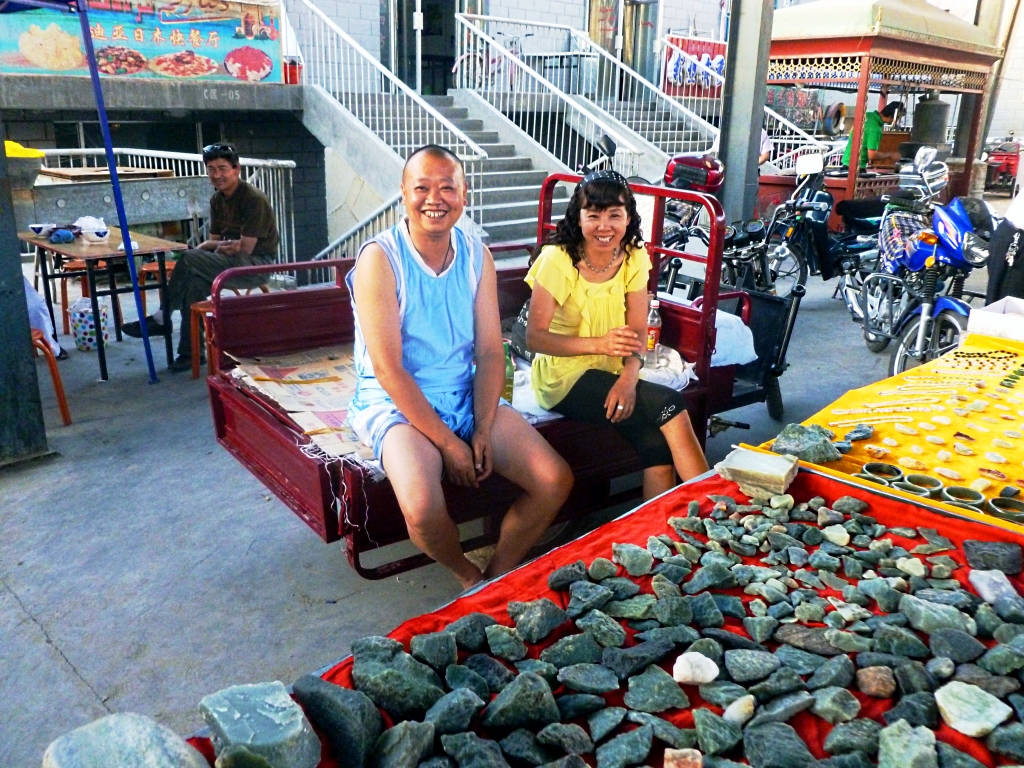
Couple selling jade in Charklik. 2011

A site within or adjoining Ruoqiang Town, Yüni 扜泥 was an ancient settlement of the independent kingdom of Kroraina (Chinese: Lou-Lan). During the latter part of the Former Han and throughout the Later Han, Yüni was the capital of the kingdom of Shanshan, a Han vassal state that succeeded Kroraina.

The modern Ruoqiang Town was founded in 1984.

In 2014, Xincheng and Loulan were established as residential communities.

== Geography ==
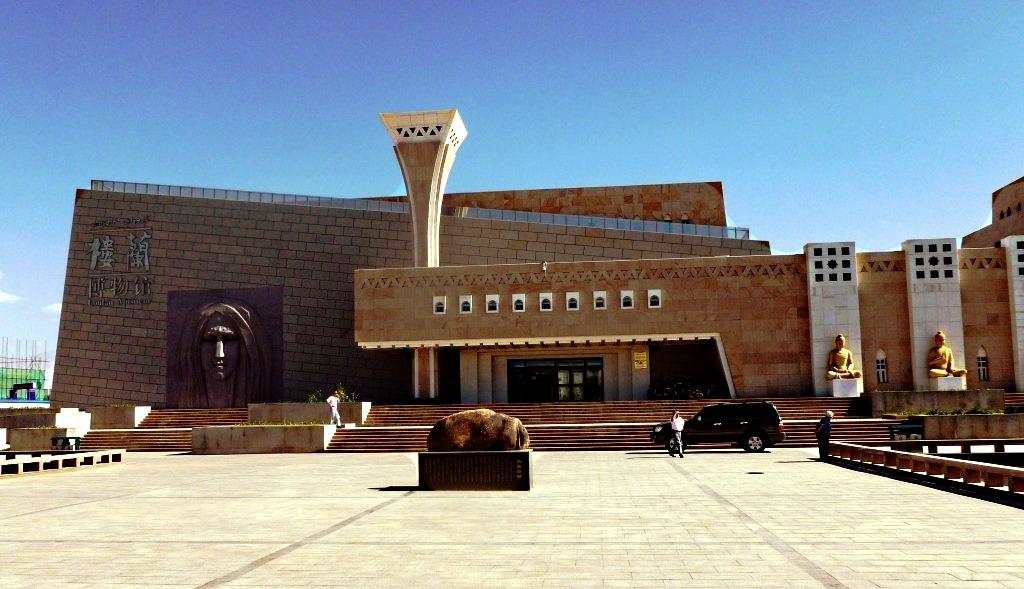
New Loulan Museum in Charklik (Ruoqiang)

Almost adjacent to the town are the Tieganlike Town, to the east, and Wutamu Township, to the west. They, however, are not administratively part of Ruoqiang Town, but are separate township-level administrative units.

Ruoqiang Town was used by numerous notable explorers as a launching point to the Lop Nor archaeological sites, which are located within 150–200 km (93–124 mi) to the northeast.

=== Climate ===
Ruoqiang has a cold desert climate (Köppen climate classification BWk) with extreme seasonal variation in temperature. The monthly 24-hour average temperature ranges from −7.4 °C (18.7 °F) in January to 27.5 °C (81.5 °F), and the annual mean is 11.7 °C (53.1 °F). Precipitation totals only 29 millimetres (1.1 in) annually, and mostly falls in summer. No month has less than 60% of possible sunshine, and the area receives close to 3,100 hours of bright sunshine annually.

Climate data for Ruoqiang, elevation 888 m (2,913 ft), (1991–2020 normals, extremes 1991–present)
Month	Jan	Feb	Mar	Apr	May	Jun	Jul	Aug	Sep	Oct	Nov	Dec	Year
Record high °C (°F)	11.1 (52.0)	19.1 (66.4)	32.0 (89.6)	40.1 (104.2)	41.4 (106.5)	42.1 (107.8)	43.9 (111.0)	42.7 (108.9)	39.6 (103.3)	33.2 (91.8)	24.1 (75.4)	17.5 (63.5)	43.9 (111.0)
Mean daily maximum °C (°F)	−0.6 (30.9)	6.9 (44.4)	16.8 (62.2)	25.2 (77.4)	30.3 (86.5)	34.5 (94.1)	36.3 (97.3)	34.9 (94.8)	29.9 (85.8)	21.6 (70.9)	10.8 (51.4)	1.0 (33.8)	20.6 (69.1)
Daily mean °C (°F)	−7.5 (18.5)	−0.9 (30.4)	8.2 (46.8)	16.4 (61.5)	21.4 (70.5)	26.1 (79.0)	27.9 (82.2)	26.0 (78.8)	19.8 (67.6)	10.9 (51.6)	2.2 (36.0)	−5.7 (21.7)	12.1 (53.7)
Mean daily minimum °C (°F)	−13.0 (8.6)	−7.4 (18.7)	0.3 (32.5)	8.0 (46.4)	12.6 (54.7)	17.6 (63.7)	19.7 (67.5)	17.7 (63.9)	11.6 (52.9)	3.2 (37.8)	−3.7 (25.3)	−10.6 (12.9)	4.7 (40.4)
Record low °C (°F)	−22.6 (−8.7)	−20.3 (−4.5)	−10.7 (12.7)	−3.9 (25.0)	1.8 (35.2)	6.4 (43.5)	11.4 (52.5)	6.9 (44.4)	−1.8 (28.8)	−6.0 (21.2)	−14.0 (6.8)	−21.3 (−6.3)	−22.6 (−8.7)
Average precipitation mm (inches)	1.3 (0.05)	0.5 (0.02)	0.6 (0.02)	1.0 (0.04)	3.3 (0.13)	8.2 (0.32)	9.5 (0.37)	6.4 (0.25)	1.2 (0.05)	0.4 (0.02)	0.6 (0.02)	1.5 (0.06)	34.5 (1.35)
Average precipitation days (≥ 0.1 mm)	1.4	0.4	0.4	0.7	1.5	3.1	2.6	1.3	0.6	0.2	0.4	1.3	13.9
Average snowy days	3.2	1.0	0.2	0.1	0	0	0	0	0	0	0.5	3.2	8.2
Average relative humidity (%)	58	43	29	26	31	36	40	42	45	48	51	60	42
Mean monthly sunshine hours	190.7	192.0	232.5	253.5	284.5	283.2	280.9	279.3	278.1	274.8	219.4	180.2	2,949.1
Percentage possible sunshine	63	62	62	63	64	64	63	67	76	81	74	62	67
Source: China Meteorological Administration

== Administrative divisions ==
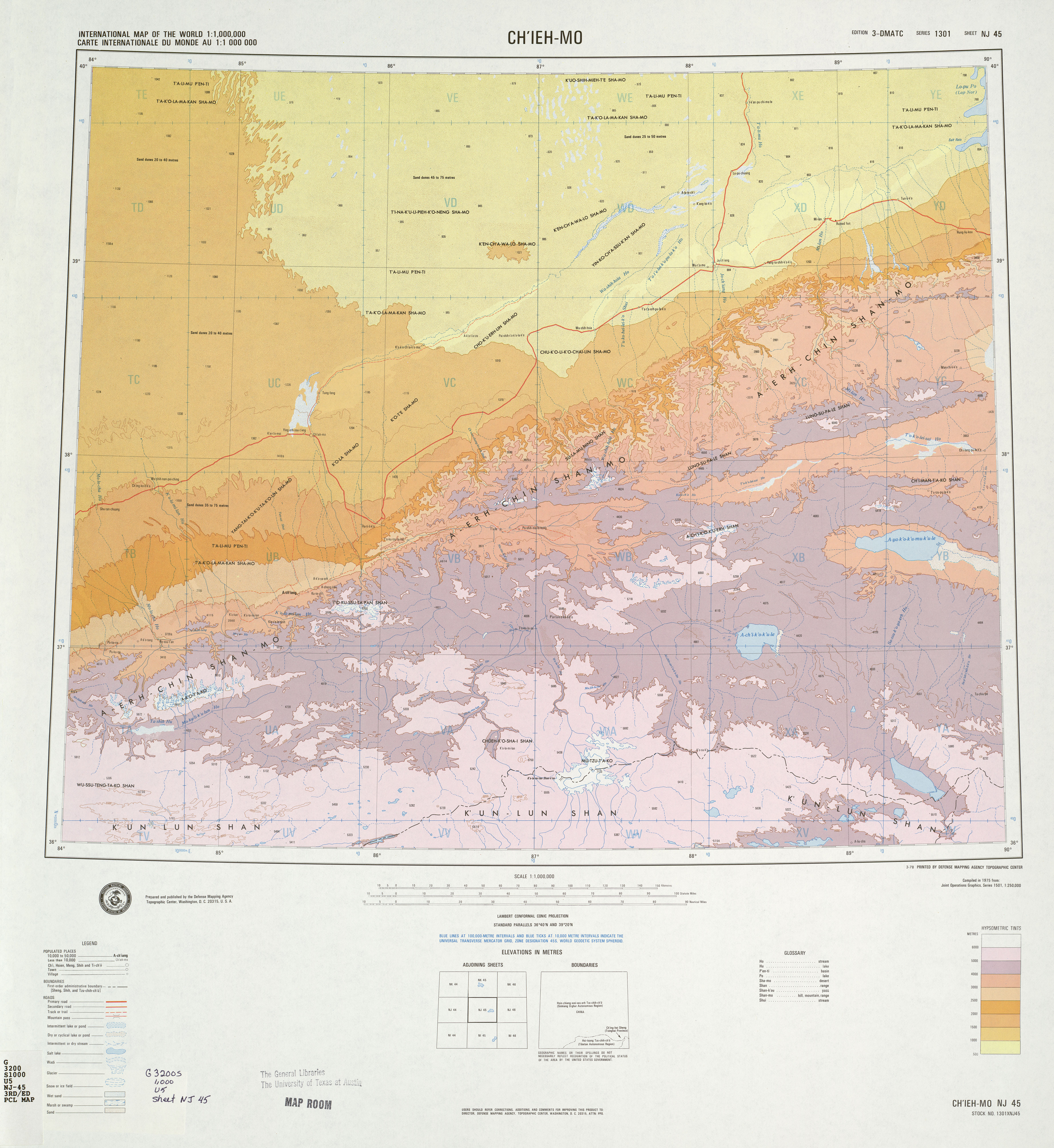
Map including Ruoqiang (labeled as Jo-ch’iang) from the International Map of the World (DMA, 1975)

As of 2018, the town was made up of five residential communities:

Residential Communities

- Shengli (胜利社区), Wenhua (文化社区), Tuanjie (团结社区), Xincheng (新城社区), Loulan (楼兰社区)

== Transportation ==
The town is the junction of China National Highway 315 and China National Highway 218, and is the southern terminus of the latter.

== See also ==
- List of township-level divisions of Xinjiang
