= China National Highway 315 =

Road in China

National Highway 315
- 315国道

Route information
- Length: 3,063 km (1,903 mi)

Major junctions
- From: Xining, Qinghai
- To: Kashi, Xinjiang

Location
- Country: China

Highway system
- National Trunk Highway System; Primary; Auxiliary
← G314	→ G316

Constructed in 1954, the Qinghai-Xinjiang Highway, also known as the China National Highway 315 (G315) runs west from Xining, Qinghai towards Kashgar, Xinjiang. It is 3,063 kilometres (1,903 mi) in length. In 1994 the departments of communication and transportation in Qinghai and Xinjiang began the process of updating the highway. In the west it follows the desert Qaidam Basin south of the traditional Silk Road, crosses the Altyn-Tagh into Xinjiang, and then follows the south side of the Tarim Basin to Kashgar.

== Route and distance ==
Route and distance

City	Distance (km)
Xining, Qinghai	0
Huangyuan, Qinghai	49
Haiyan, Qinghai	88
Gangca, Qinghai	199
Tianjun, Qinghai	315
Ulan, Qinghai	398
Delingha, Qinghai	548
Ruoqiang, Xinjiang	1555
Qiemo, Xinjiang	1926
Niya County (Minfeng), Xinjiang	2241
Keriya County (Yutian), Xinjiang	2357
Qira County, Xinjiang	2440
Lop County, Xinjiang	2509
Hotan, Xinjiang	2528
Karakax County (Moyu), Xinjiang	2554
Pishan County, Xinjiang	2719
Kargilik Town (Yecheng), Xinjiang	2807
Poskam (Zepu), Xinjiang	2844
Shache, Xinjiang	2871
Yengisar, Xinjiang	2994
Shule County, Xinjiang	3053
Kashgar (Kashi), Xinjiang	3063

== Gallery ==
=== Hotan Prefecture (Mingfeng-Hotan-Pishan), Xinjiang ===
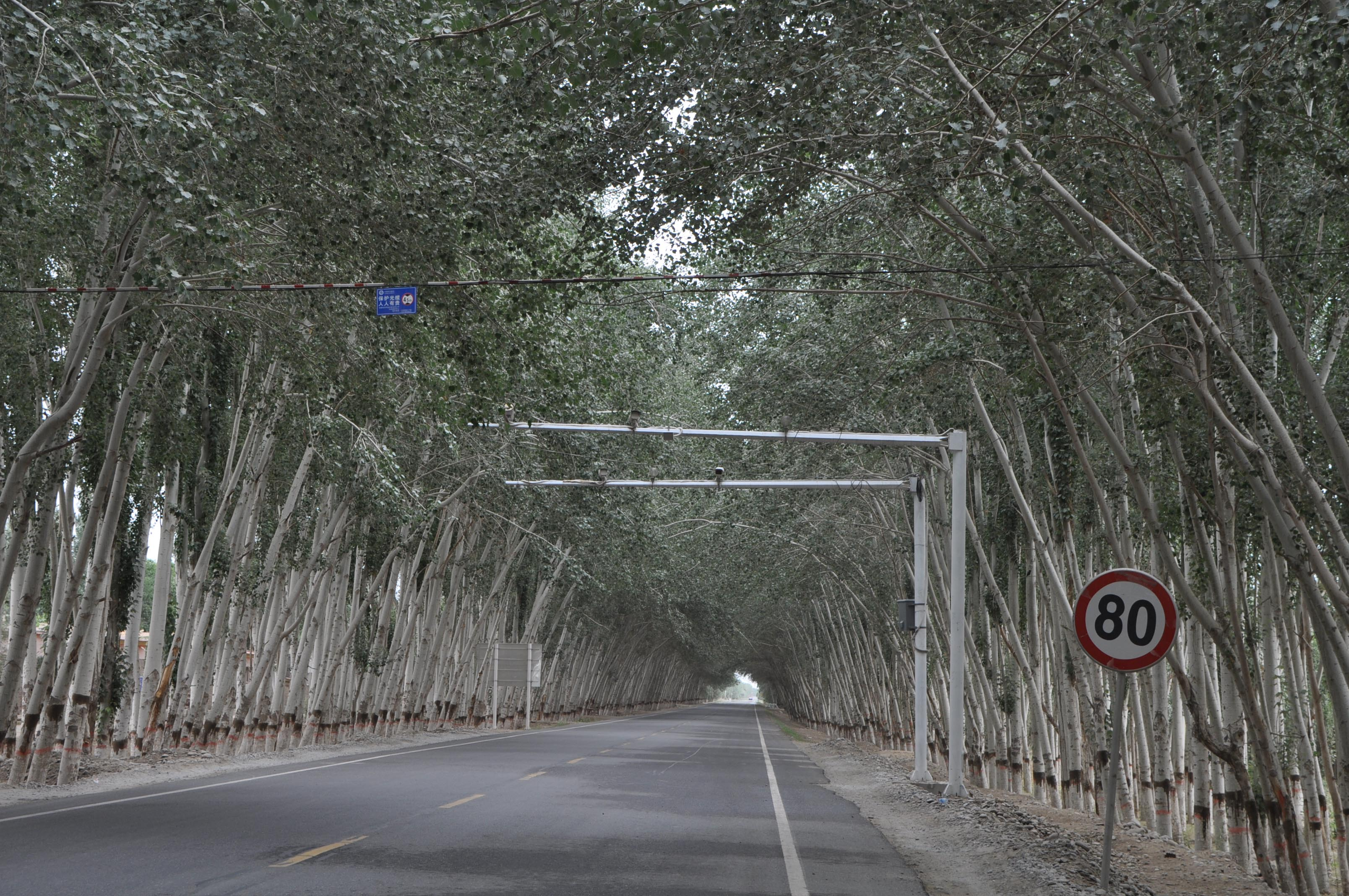
Cruising pleasantly along the tree-lined highway

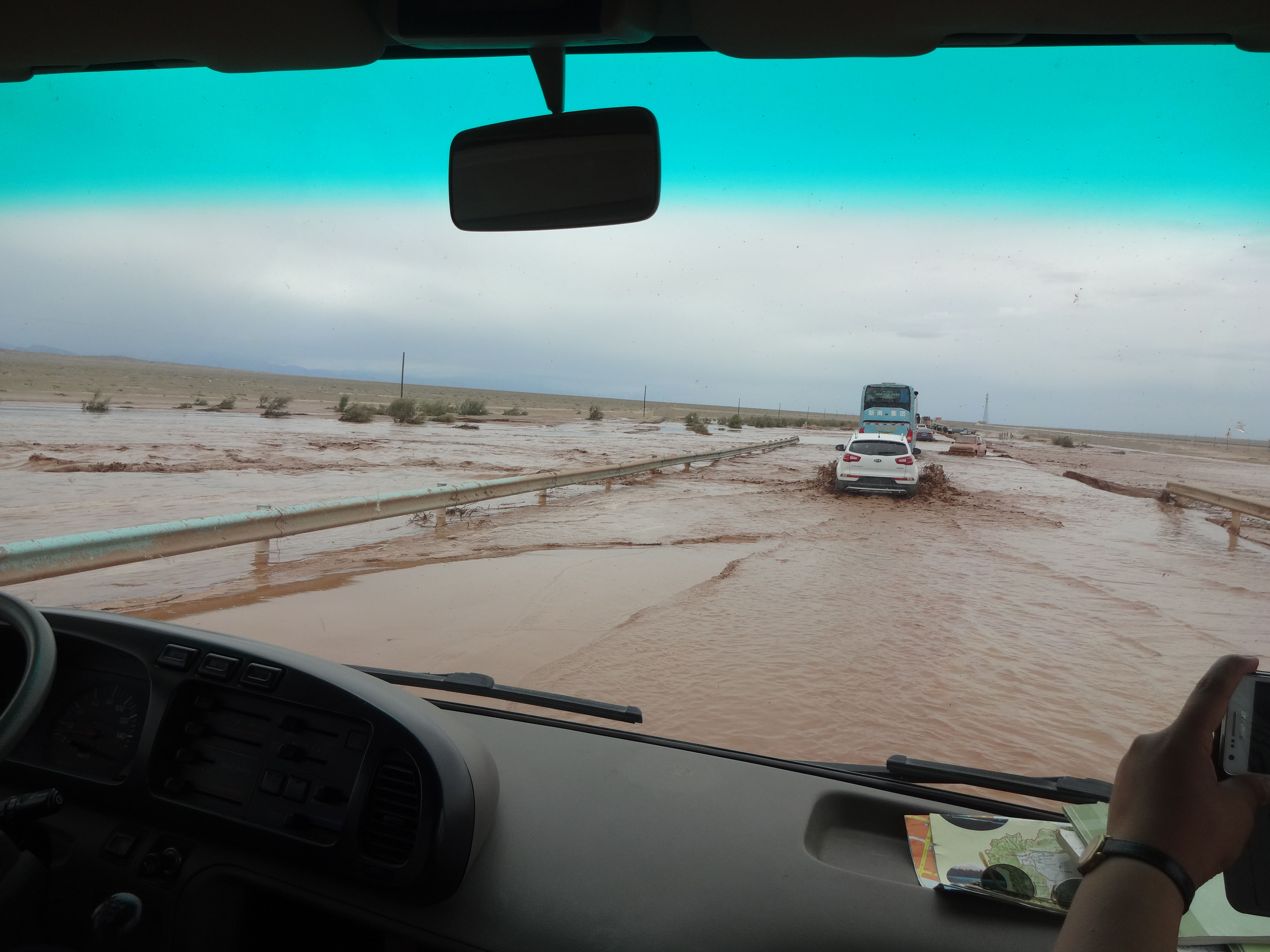
After heavy rain, the highway was closed for three days (June, 2013)

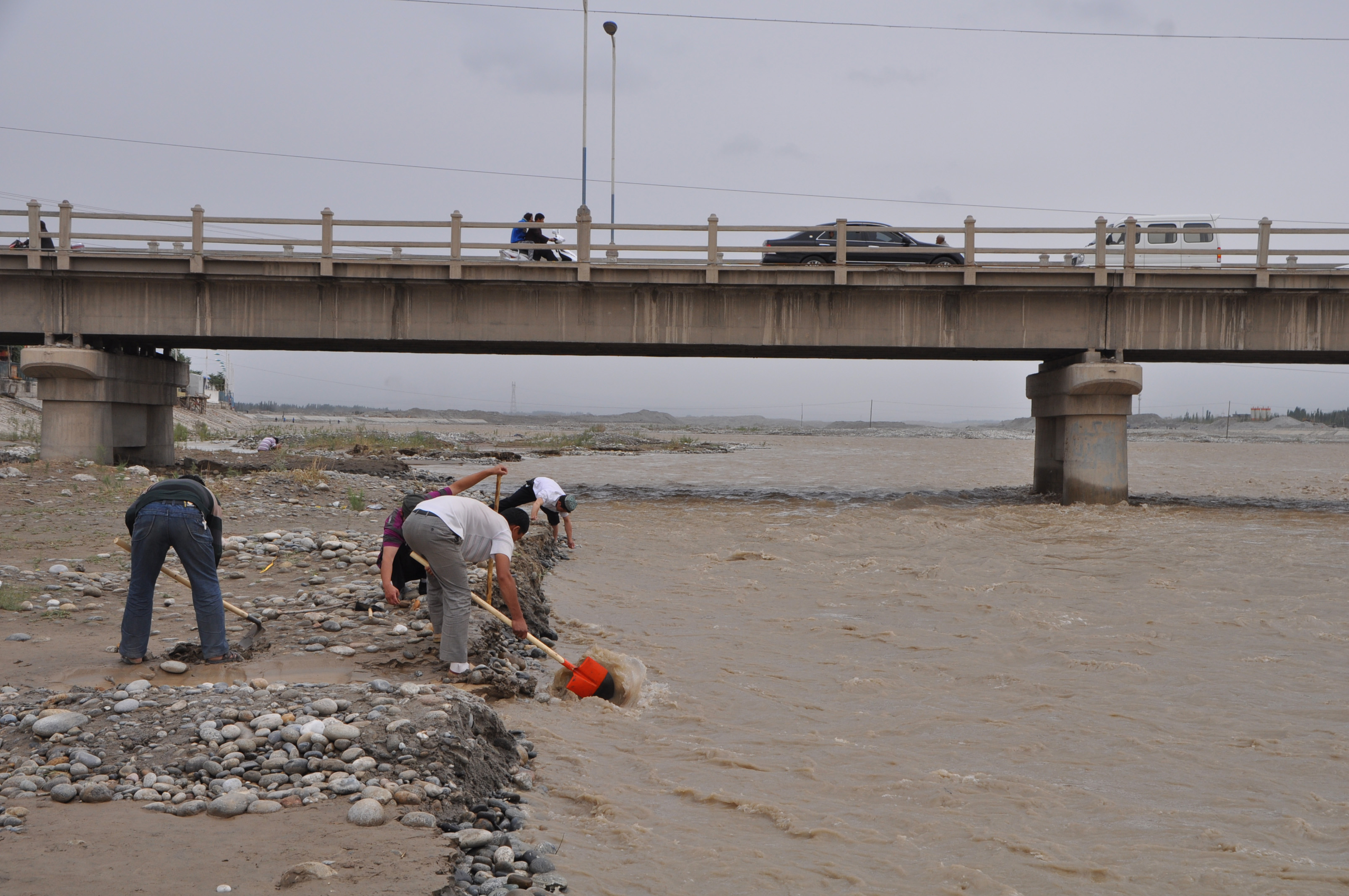
Digging for jade under the G315 Highway bridge over the Hotan River

=== Kashgar Prefecture (Yarkand-Yengisar-Kashgar), Xinjiang ===
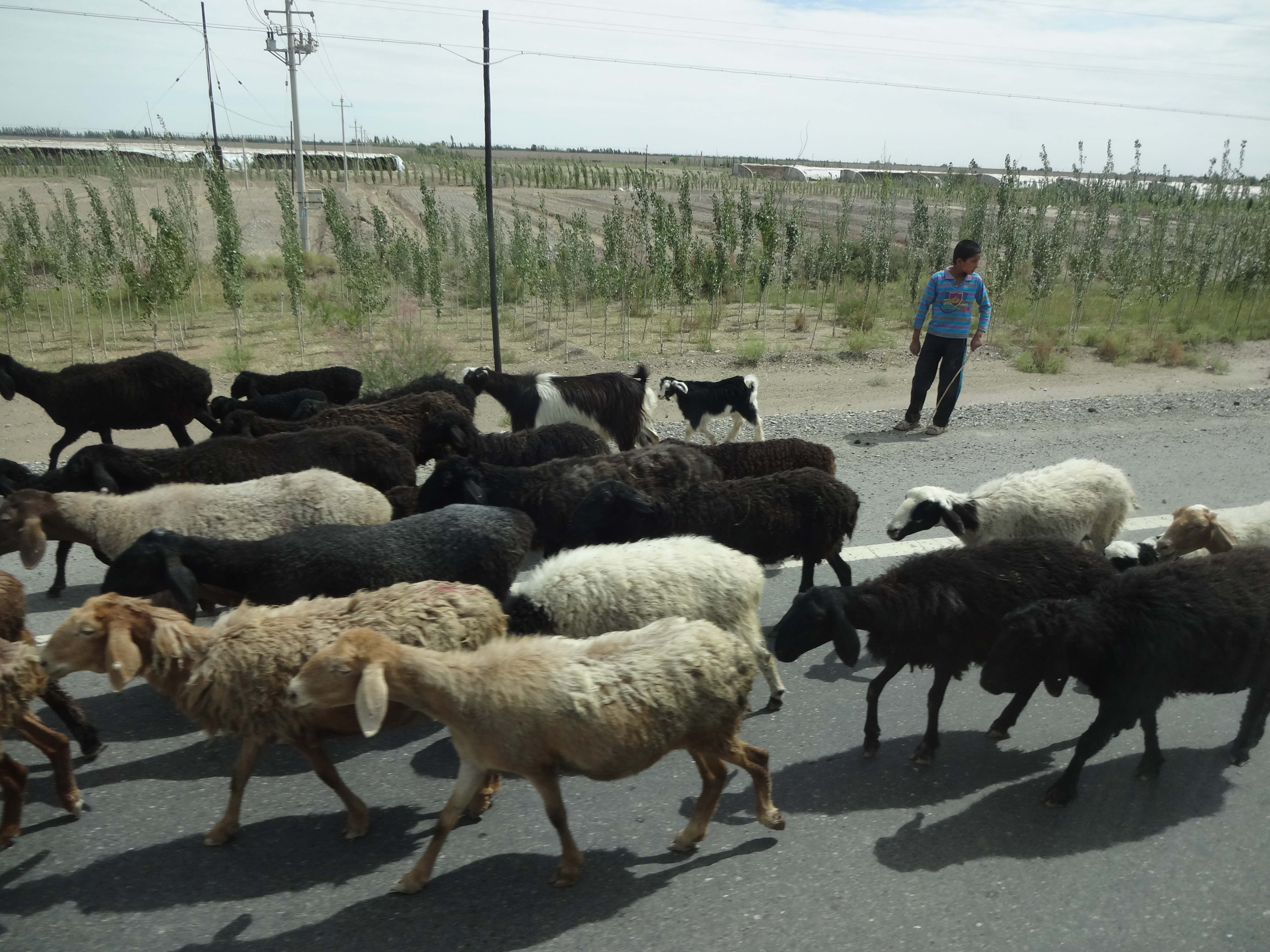
Yarkand on G315 Highway, Xinjiang

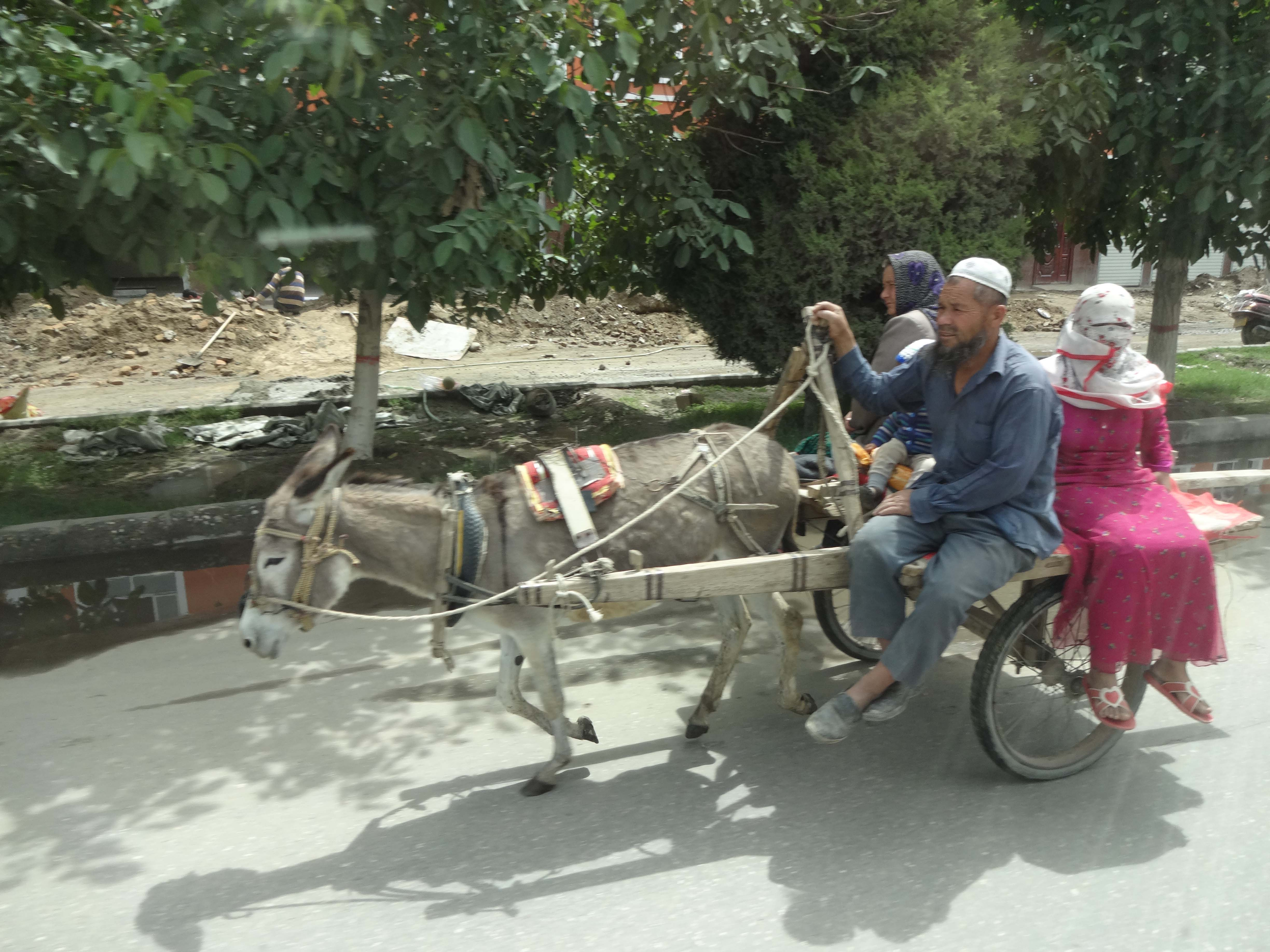
Yarkand on G315 Highway, Xinjiang

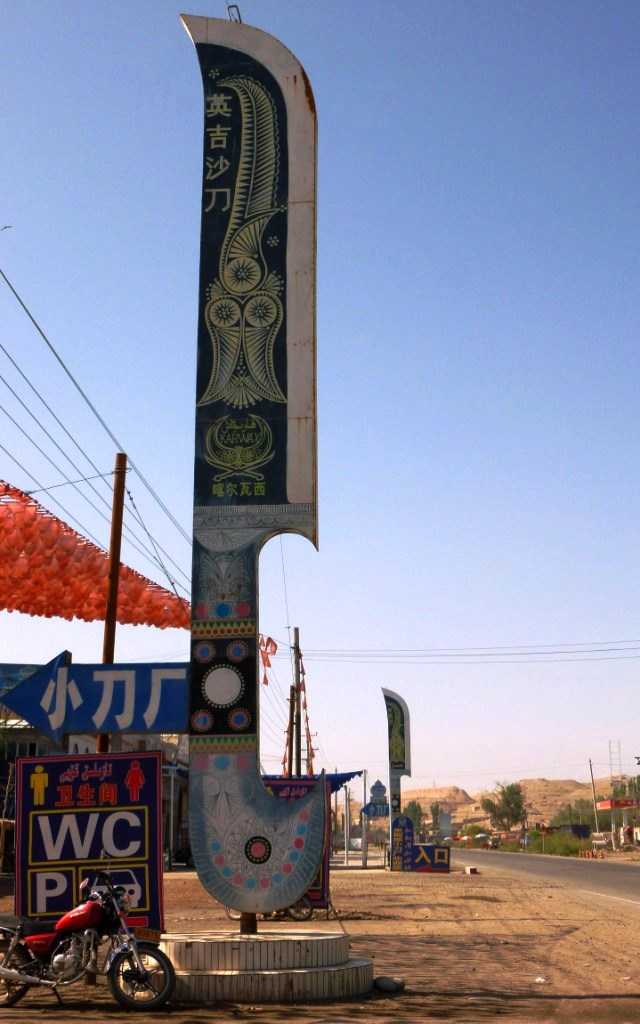
A roadside knife shop in Yengisar, Xinjiang

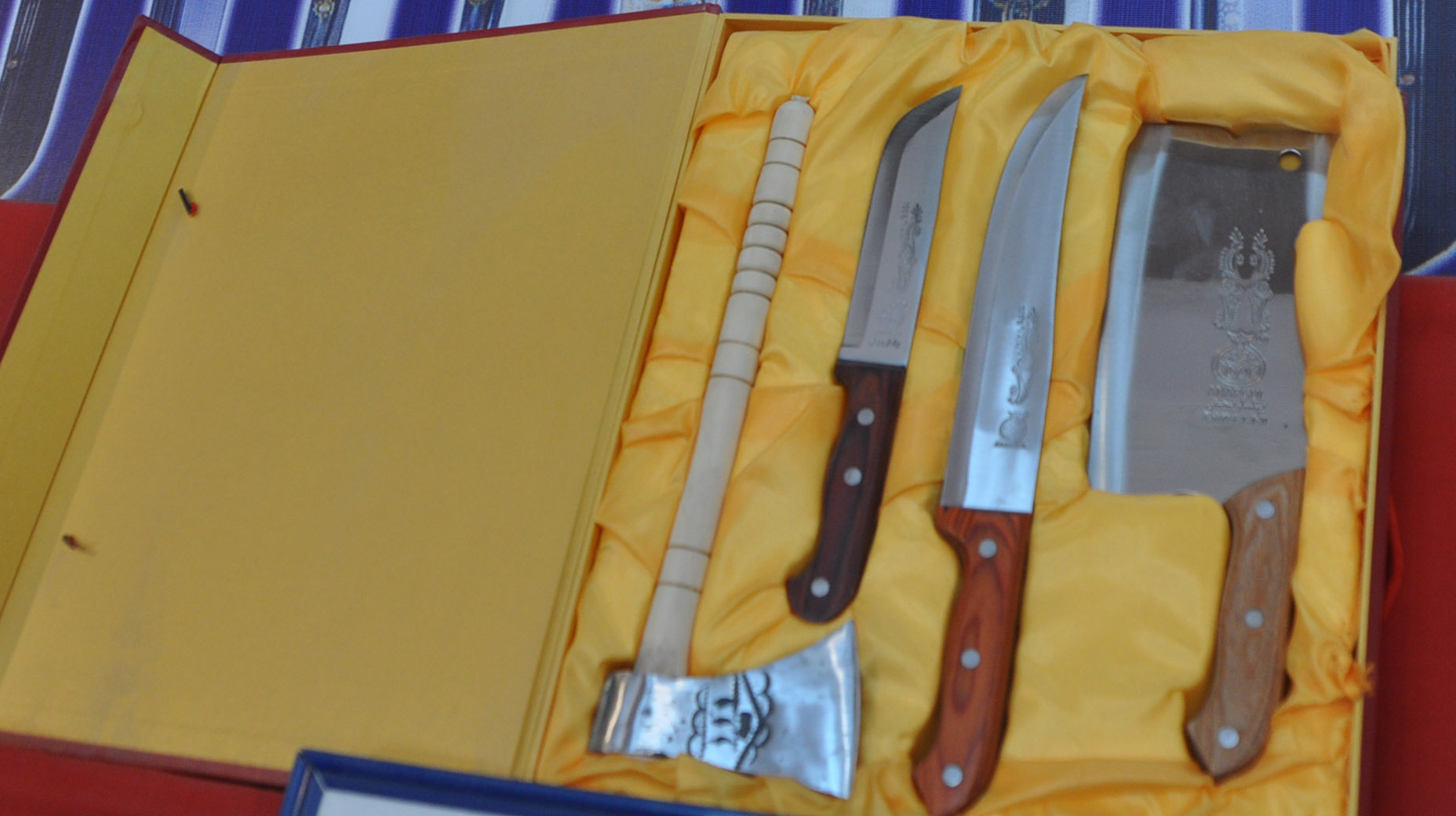
Knives sold on G315 Highway, Yengisar

== See also ==
- China National Highways
