= List of ultras of Tibet, East Asia and neighbouring areas =

This is a list of all the ultra prominent peaks (with topographic prominence greater than 1,500 metres) in central, south and east Asia.

== Kunlun Mountains and Northeastern Tibet Plateau ==
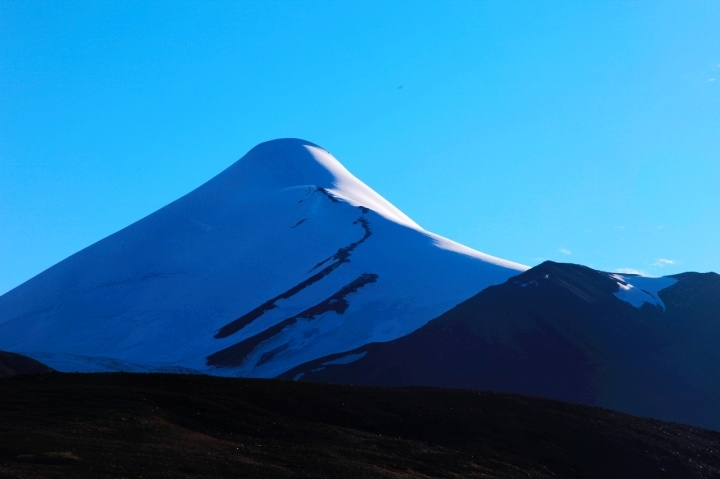
Yuzhu Peak, China

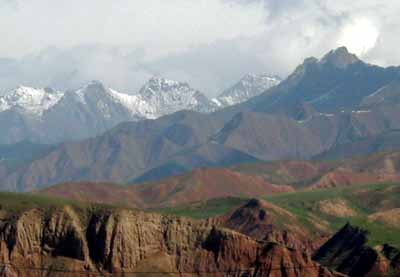
Qilian Shan, China

Gangshiqia Peak, China

No	Peak	Country	Elevation (m)	Prominence (m)	Col (m)
1	Altun Shan	China	5,830	2,528	3302
2	Tekilik Shan	China	5,450	2,316	3134
3	Kangze Gyai	China	5,808	2,231	3577
4	Sulamutag Feng	China	6,245	2,028	4217
5	Amne Machin	China	6,282	1,960	4322
6	Liushi Shan	China	7,167	1,946	5221
7	Ulugh Muztagh	China	6,973	1,943	5030
8	Aleke Tag	China	6,065	1,923	4142
9	Bukadaban Feng	China	6,860	1,922	4938
10	Sicha Xuefeng (Ak Tag)	China	6,748	1,920	4828
11	HP Ayaliktag Range	China	6,130	1,728	4402
12	Sob Gangri	China	6,224	1,674	4550
13	Selik Gulam Muztag	China	6,691	1,660	5031
14	Mush Muztagh	China	6,638	1,631	5007
15	Kogantag	China	4,800	1,611	3189
16	HP Qilian Shan	China	5,547	1,593	4982
17	Yenui Shan	China	4,880	1,540	3340
18	Point 5350 (China)	China	5,350	1,537	3813
19	Karakash Shan	China	6,510	1,528	4982
20	Chung Muztagh	China	6,962	1,512	5450
21	Gangshiqia Peak	China	5,254	1,504	3750
22	Qaidam Shan	China	5,759	1,500	4259

== Western Tibet and neighboring areas ==
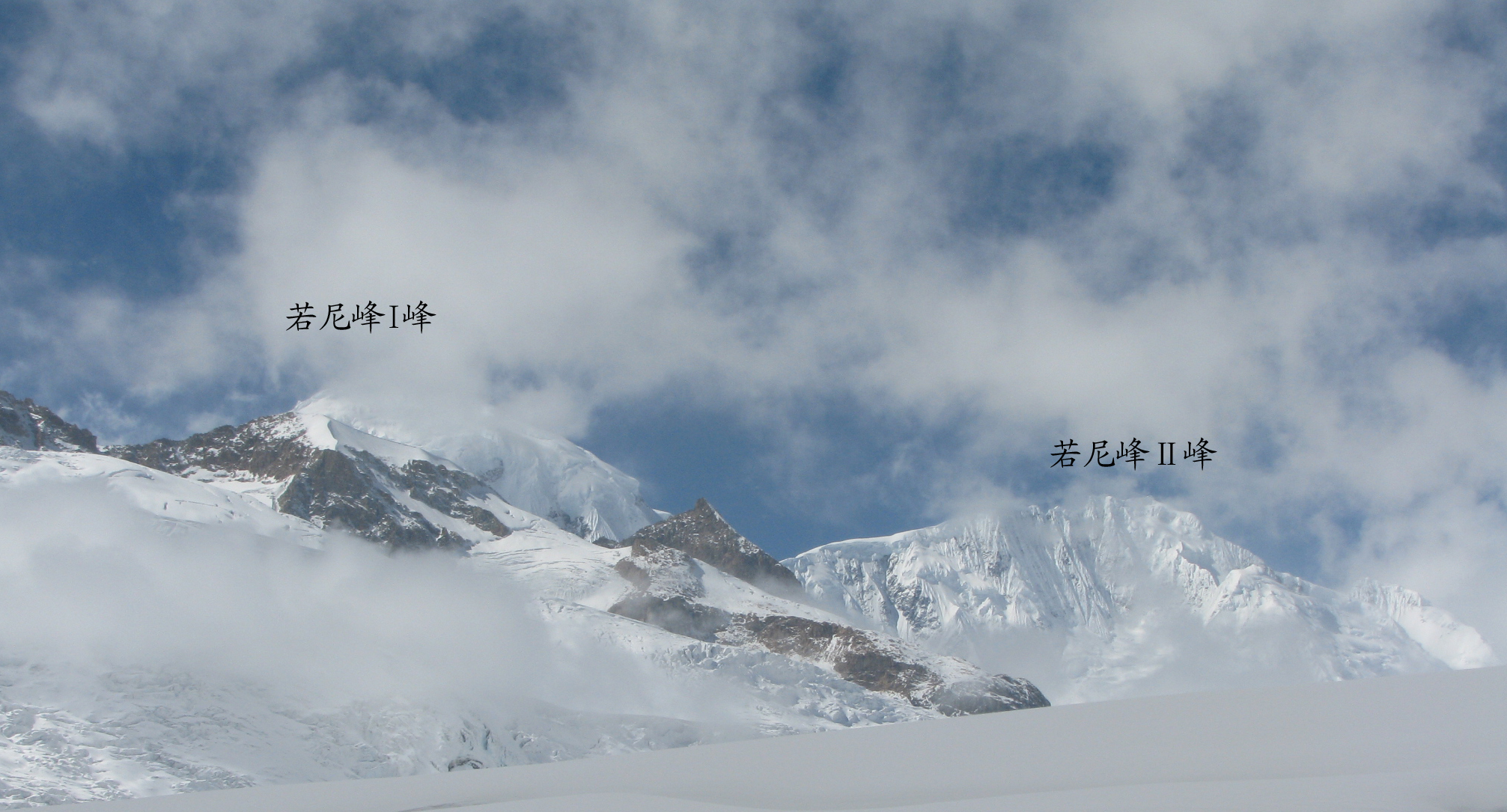
Bairiga, China

No	Peak	Country	Elevation (m)	Prominence (m)	Col (m)
1	Kangju Kangri	India	6,725	2,147	4578
2	Lunpo Gangri	China	7,095	1,941	5154
3	Shakangshan	China	6,822	1,914	4908
4	Bangong	China	6,260	1,879	4381
5	Nyonno Ri	China	6,724	1,805	4919
6	Nganglong Kangri	China	6,720	1,772	4948
7	Point 6300	India / China	6,300	1,660	4640
8	Shahi Kangri	India	6,934	1,580	5354
9	Kataklik Kangri	India / China	6,897	1,543	5354

== South-eastern Tibet and neighboring areas ==
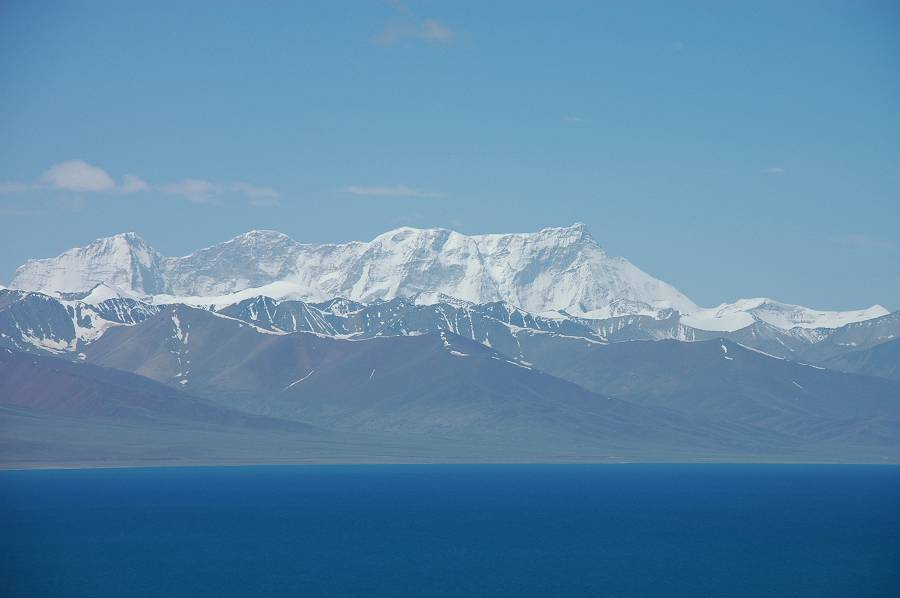
Nyenchen Tanglha, China

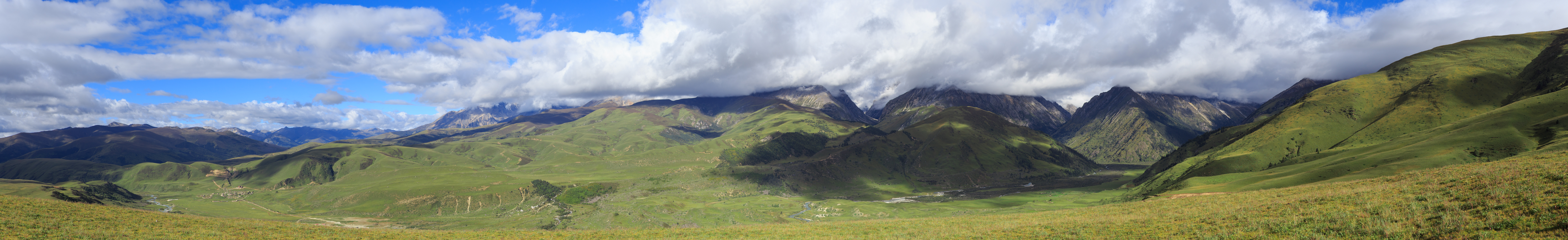
Ge'nyen, China

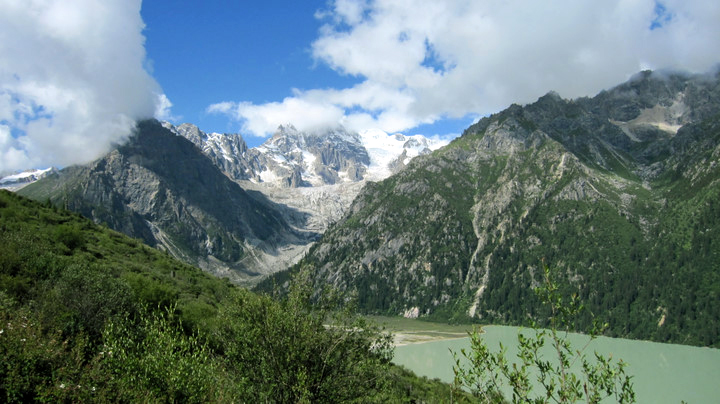
Rongme Ngatra, China

No	Peak	Country	Elevation (m)	Prominence (m)	Col (m)
1	Gyala Peri	China	7,294	2,942	4352
2	Bairiga	China	6,882	2,444	4438
3	Nyainqentanglha Feng	China	7,162	2,239	4923
4	Sepu Kangri	China	6,956	2,213	4743
5	Kawarani	China	5,992	2,018	3974
6	Ge'nyen	China	6,204	2,000	4204
7	Point 6327	China	6,327	1,863	4464
8	Rongme Ngatra	China	6,168	1,703	4465
9	Point 6310	China	6,310	1,673	4637
10	Bu Gyai Kangri	China	6,328	1,666	4662
11	Point 6135	China	6,135	1,634	4501
12	Nenang	China	6,870	1,630	5240
13	Samdain Kangsang	China	6,590	1,614	4976
14	Beu-tse	China	6,270	1,558	4712
15	Geladandong	China	6,621	1,541	5080

== Yunnan ==
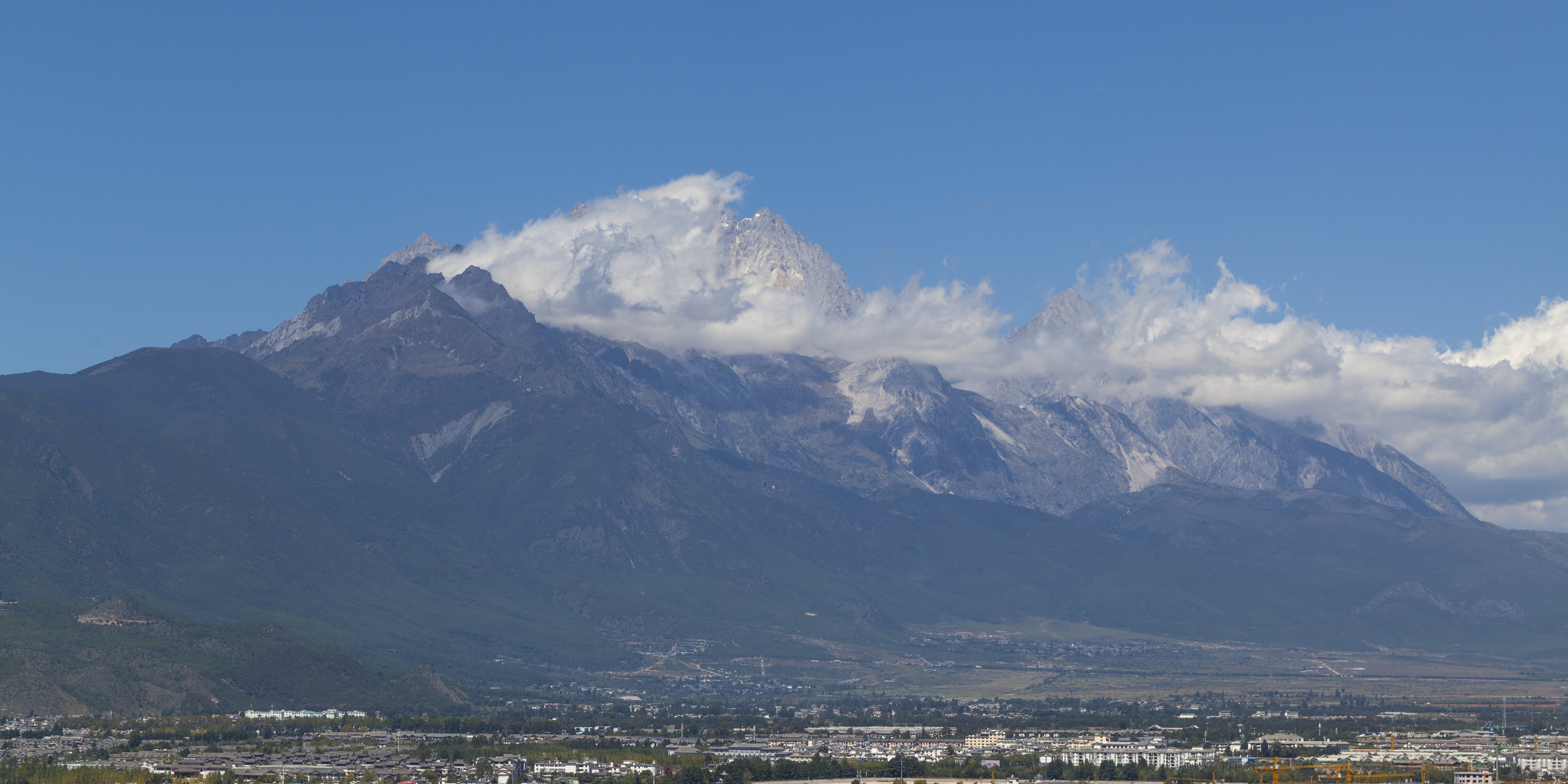
Jade Dragon Snow Mountain, China

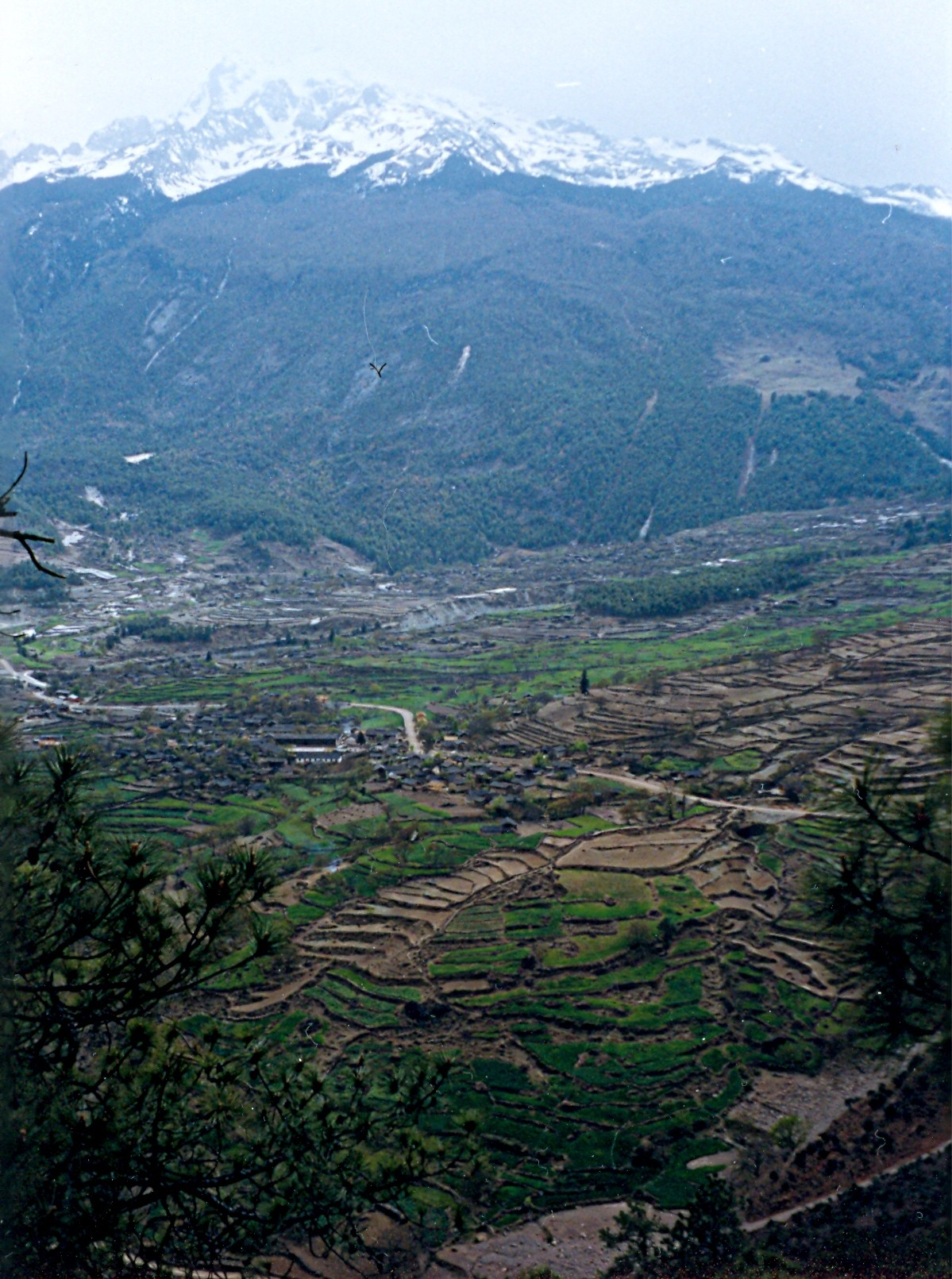
Haba Xueshan, China

No	Peak	Country	Elevation (m)	Prominence (m)	Col (m)
1	Jade Dragon Snow Mountain	China	5,596	3,202	2394
2	Jiaozi Snow Mountain	China	4,330	2,470	1860
3	Kawagebo	China	6,740	2,232	4508
4	Yao Shan	China	4,050	1,996	2054
5	Point 5841	China	5,841	1,934	3907
6	Hkaru Bum	Burma	3,677	1,914	1763
7	Xiannairi	China	6,032	1,878	4154
8	Point 4030	China	4,030	1,837	4565
9	Haba Snow Mountain	China	5,396	1,794	3602
10	Point 4520	China	4,520	1,786	2734
11	Damyon	China	6,324	1,759	4565
12	Point 3480	China	3,480	1,750	1730
13	Dabaicao Ling	China	3,680	1,738	1942
14	Xuebang Shan	China	4,260	1,735	4565
15	HP Baxoila Ling	China	6,146	1,721	4425
16	Point 4911	China	4,911	1,690	3221
17	Finchuiyanou Range	China	3,580	1,590	1990
18	Laotzyunshan	China	4,500	1,558	2942
19	Cangshan	China	4,122	1,502	2620

== Daxue Mountains of Sichuan ==
No	Peak	Country	Elevation (m)	Prominence (m)	Col (m)
1	Gongga Shan	China	7,556	3,642	3914
2	Jiuding Shan	China	4,969	2,808	2161
3	Yaomei Feng	China	6,250	2,571	3679
4	Huatou Jian	China	4,750	2,223	2527
5	Lamo-She	China	6,070	2,093	3977
6	Mount Xuebaoding	China	5,588	2,057	3531
7	HP Dalyandun Range	China	4,041	1,905	2136
8	HP Lunan Shan	China	4,300	1,760	2540
9	Dapin Shan	China	5,412	1,728	3684
10	Jiankho Shan	China	5,300	1,692	3608
11	Jiaojin Shan	China	5,734	1,681	4053
12	Point 3030	China	3,030	1,656	1374
13	Jinping Shan	China	4,420	1,630	2790
14	Point 4260	China	4,260	1,625	2635
15	Haizi Shan	China	5,820	1,578	4242
16	Point 5744	China	5,744	1,563	4181
17	Yaoji Shan	China	3,590	1,552	2038

== Contiguous Eastern China ==
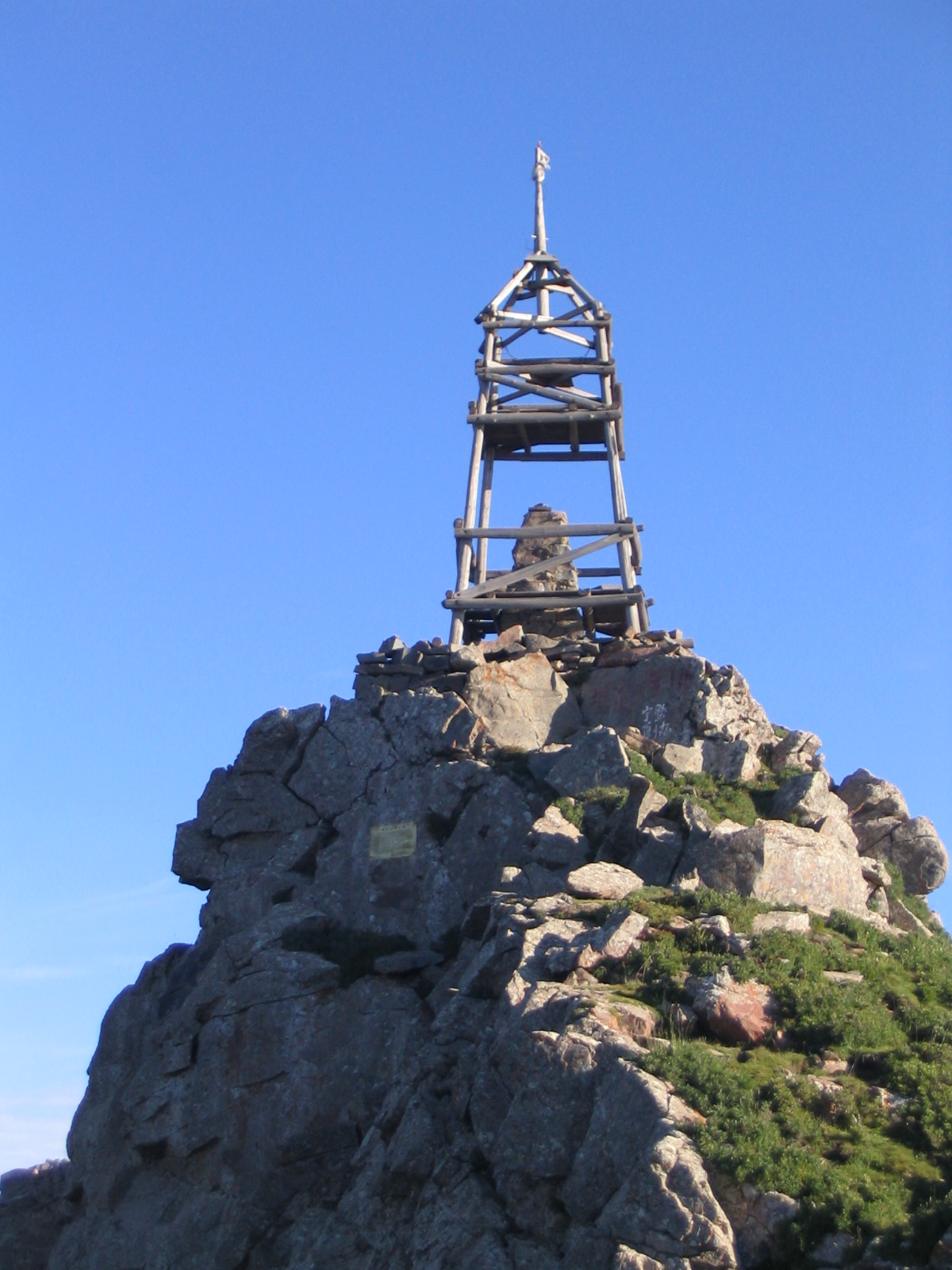
Oboo Geda, Helan Shan.

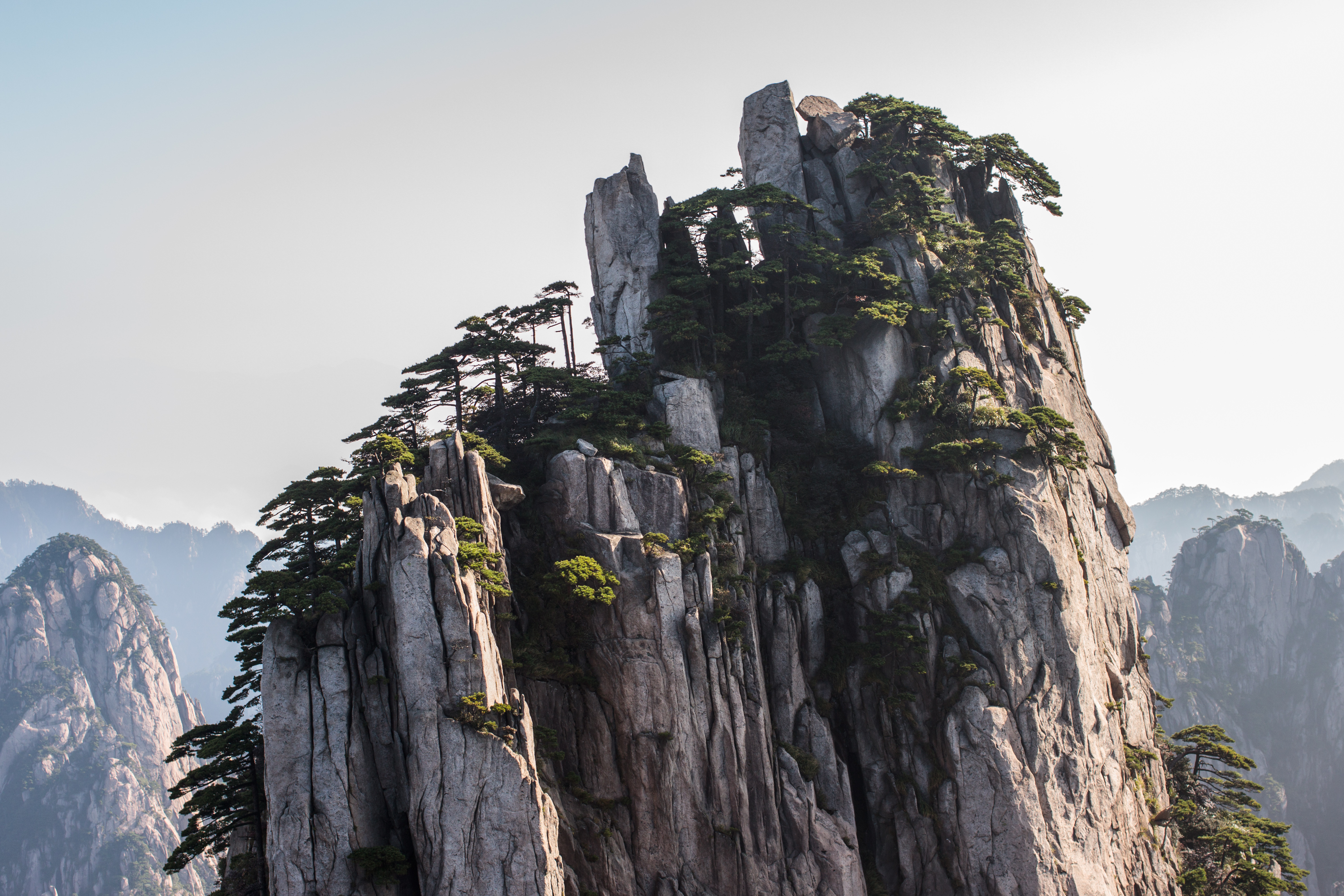
Lianhua Feng, Huang Shan

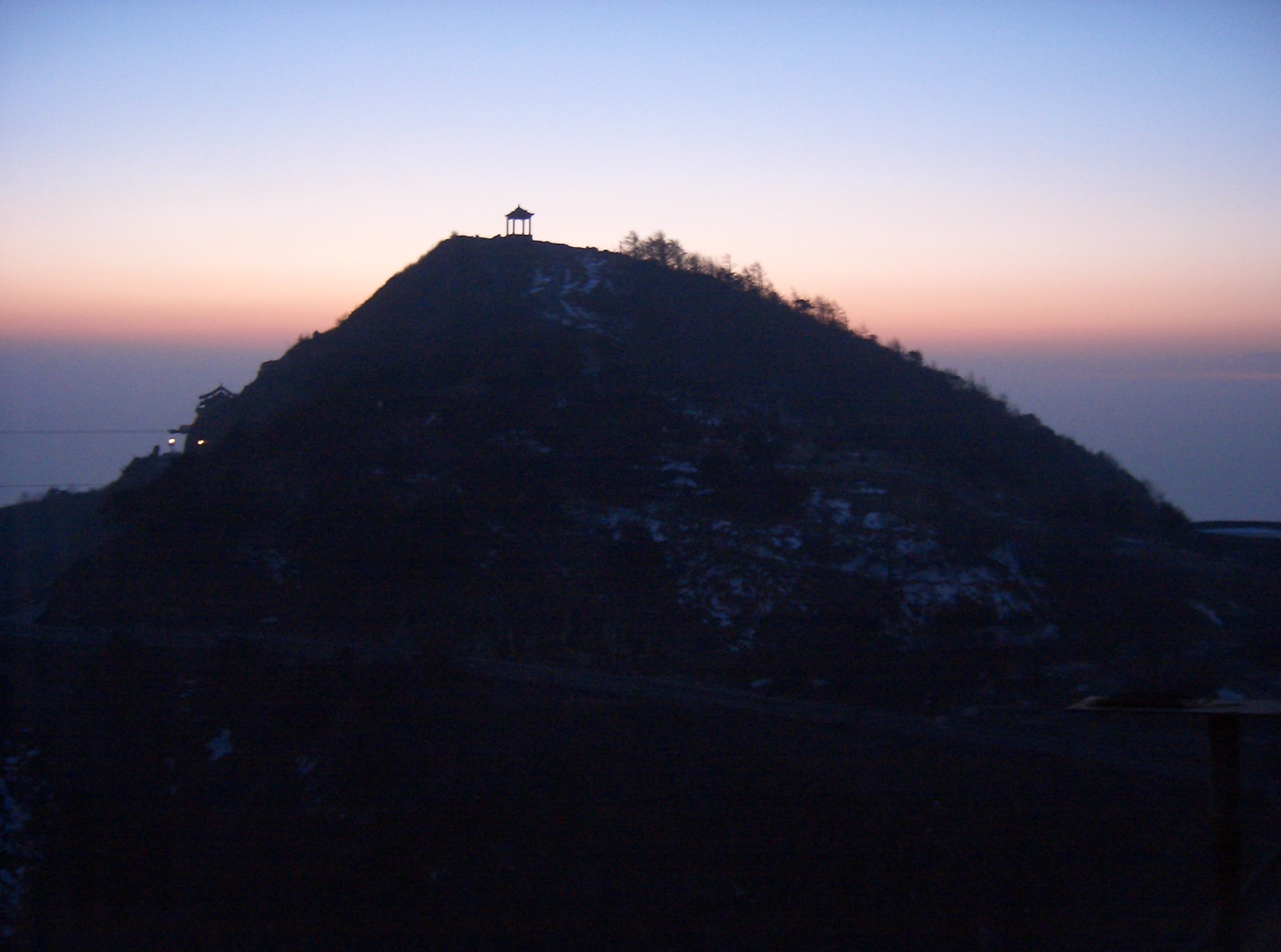
Mount Tai, China

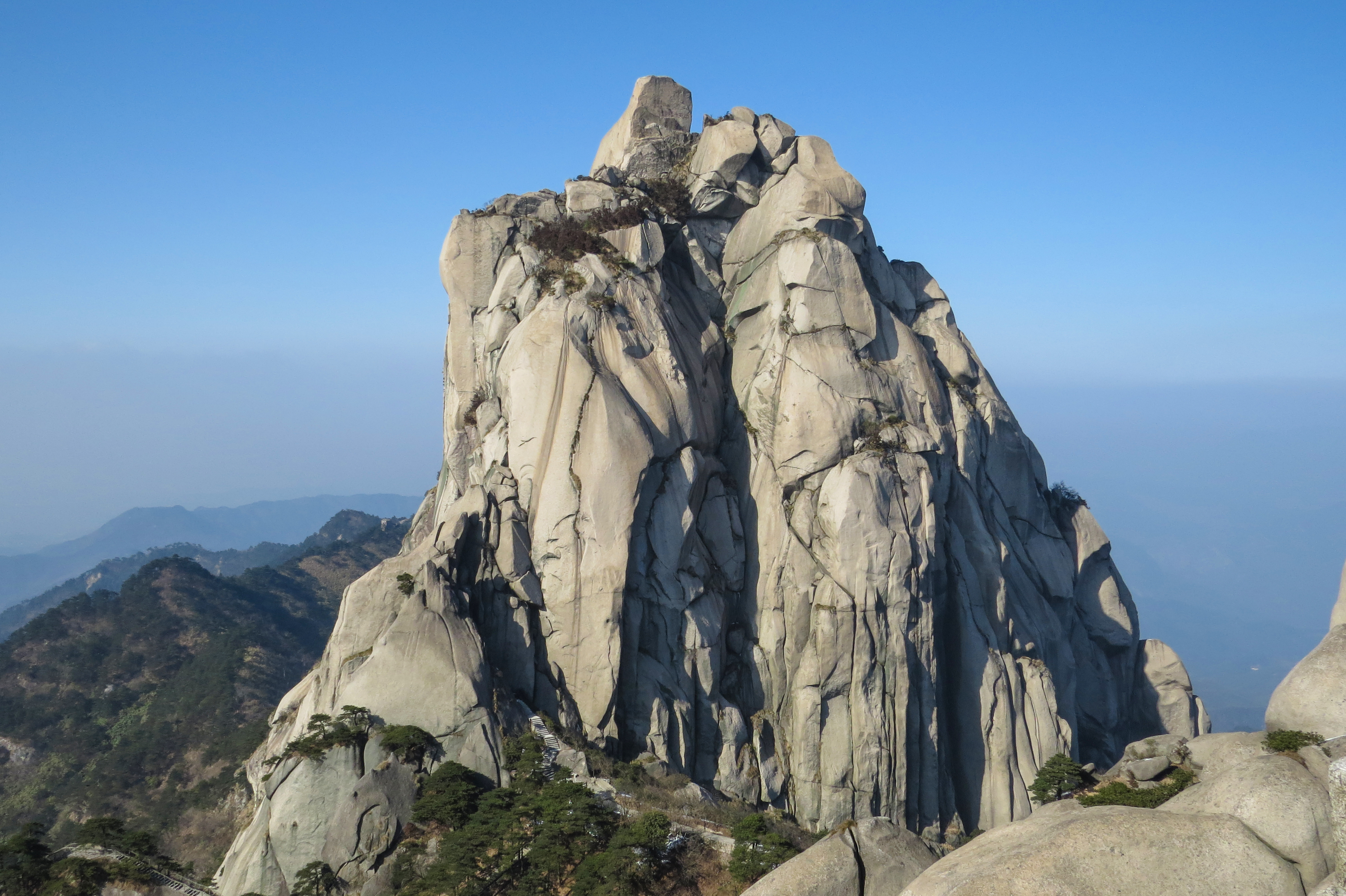
Mount Tianzhu, China

No	Peak	Subdivision	Elevation (m)	Prominence (m)	Col (m)
1	Mount Taibai	Shaanxi	3,750	2,232	1518
2	Dashennongjia	Hubei	3,100	2,270	830
3	Obo Geda a.k.a. Mati Peak (HP Helan Mountains)	Inner Mongolia	3,540	2,098	1442
4	Mount Huanggang	Guangdong	2,170	1,965	205
5	Nanfengmian		2,140	1,921	219
6	Shengtang Shan		1,935	1,785	150
7	Northern Summit (Yedou Peak) of Wutai Shan	Shanxi	3,061	1,784	1277
8	Fenghuang Shan of Guizhou	Guizhou	2,570	1,762	808
9	Jiucai Ling		2,010	1,735	275
10	Huangshan	Anhui	1,864	1,734	130
11	Wugong Shan	Jiangxi	1,920	1,722	198
12	Kitten Mountain	Guangxi	2,140	1,647	493
13	Mount Tianzhu	Anhui	1,760	1,642	118
14	Bai Yi Zhai		2,323	1,658	665
15	Benjiwo		1,953	1,625	328
16	Jiuling Shan		1,790	1,624	166
17	Shikengkong	Guangdong	1,895	1,622	273
18	Datian Ding		1,704	1,609	95
19	Yujing Feng		1,810	1,596	214
20	Mount Gumuyuan 古木源山, a.k.a. Yinding Shan (银锭山?, 24º53'33"N, 111º10'00"E)	Guangxi	1,857.1	1,574	283
21	Daming Shan		1,785	1,570	215
22	Huangmao Jian		1,930	1,530	400
23	Baojie Ling		1,930	1,530	400
24	Qingliang Feng	Zhejiang	1,787	1,521	266
25	Tiewadian of Fenghuang Mountains (a.k.a. Tevodian)		2128.3	1,597	523
27	Mount Xiaowutai	Hebei	2870	1,519	1351
27	Mount Wuling	Hebei	2118	1,508	around 600
28	Mount Tai	Shandong	1,545	1,505	40

== Taiwan and Hainan ==
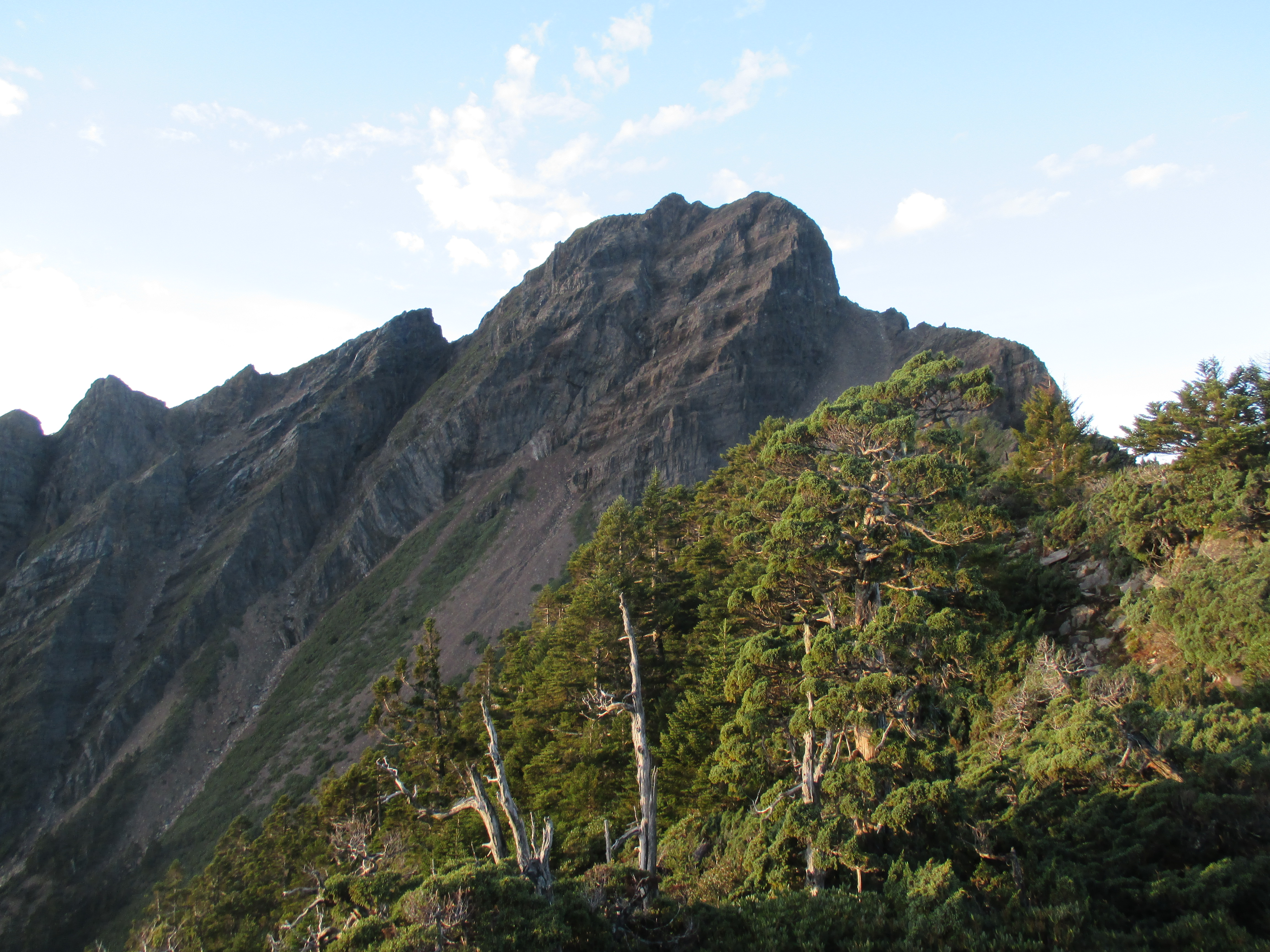
Yushan, Taiwan

No	Peak	Country	Elevation (m)	Prominence (m)	Col (m)
1	Yushan	Republic of China	3,952	3,952	0
2	Xueshan	Republic of China	3,886	1,932	1954
3	Wuzhi Shan	China (Hainan)	1,840	1,840	0

== South India and Sri Lanka ==
No	Peak	Country	Elevation (m)	Prominence (m)	Col (m)
1	Pidurutalagala	Sri Lanka	2,524	2,524	0
2	Anamudi	India	2,695	2,479	215
3	Doddabetta	India	2,636	2,256	380
4	Elivai Malai	India	2,088	1,540	548
