= Tekilik Shan =

Mountain in Xinjiang, China

- Location within China

Highest point
- Elevation: 5,450 m (17,880 ft)
- Prominence: 2,316 m (7,598 ft)
- Isolation: 48.59 km (30.19 mi)
- Listing: Ultra
- Coordinates: 36°31′N 80°19′E

Geography
- Country: China
- Region: Xinjiang
- Parent range: Kunlun Mountains

Tekilik Shan is a mountain located in the Kunlun Mountains in Xinjiang, China. It is an ultra-prominent peak and is 121st highest in Asia. It has an elevation of 5,450 m (17,880 ft).

== See also ==
- List of ultras of Tibet, East Asia and neighbouring areas
