= Walkerana muduga =

Conservation status
- Data Deficient (IUCN 3.1)

Scientific classification
- Kingdom: Animalia
- Phylum: Chordata
- Class: Amphibia
- Order: Anura
- Family: Ranixalidae
- Genus: Walkerana
- Species: W. muduga

Binomial name
- Walkerana muduga Dinesh, Vijayakumar, Ramesh, Jayarajan, Chandramouli, and Shanker, 2020
- Walkerana muduga is known from the Elivai Malai range in the Western Ghats of India

Species of frogs

Walkerana muduga, also known as the Muduga mountain leaping frog (Note: Capitalization as given by Dinesh and colleagues (2020)) or Muduga leaping frog, is a species of frog in the family Ranixalidae. It is endemic to the Western Ghats of India and known from the Elivai Malai range, north of the Palghat Gap in Tamil Nadu. All other known species of Walkerana occur south of the Palghat Gap, and molecular data suggest that Walkerana muduga is deeply divergent from the more southern species. However, there is another, as yet undescribed lineage from north of the Palghat Gap that is known from a single, poorly preserve specimen.

== Etymology ==
Walkerana muduga is named after the Mudugar indigenous community of Palghat district, Kerala.

== Description ==
Two male specimens measure 23 and 29 mm (0.9 and 1.1 in) in snout–vent length, whereas an adult female specimen is much larger, 45 mm (1.8 in) in SVL. The body is squat and raised. The snout is bluntly pointed. The tympanum is distinct but partly concealed by the supratympanic fold. The finger and the toe tips have truncated, enlarged discs. The fingers have no webbing while the toes have reduced webbing. Skin is dorsally smooth, but there are some small, longitudinal glandular skin folds. The dorsum is light fleshy brown. The bases of the raised folds are dark brown. The inter-orbital space has light brown blotches. The lower lip is barred. A dark brown streak runs from the tip of snout till the end of the supratympanic fold. The flanks are uniform light brown without any markings. The limbs are barred. The region of throat is yellowish brown while the belly is whitish grey.

== Tadpoles ==
Scientists infer that this frog's tadpoles do not live in the water exclusively. Instead, they move across wet rocks and moss using their tails and their back legs, which grow in at a younger age than those of other species.

== Habitat and conservation ==
The type series was collected at 1,554 m (5,098 ft) above sea level. Dinesh and colleagues report having observed multiple populations of Walkerana north of the Palghat Gap. The frog has been observed in grasslands and swamps. Scientists infer it might also appear in agricultural areas, such as cardamom plantations, but this has not been observed as of 2023. All observations have taken place between 800 and 1900 meters above sea level.

General threats in the area include deforestation, forest degradation, and climate change. Specifically, the IUCN cites tourism as a possible threat, though most tourists rarely visit the elevations at which the frog has been found. Climate change could also pose a threat. Because the frog lives at high elevations, it would not be able to migrate to other suitable habitats easily. Scientists have observed the fungus Batrachochytrium dendrobatidis on other frogs in the same family. Batrachochytrium dendrobatidis causes the fungal disease chytridiomycosis.
