= Gangshika Peak =

Mountain in Qinghai, China

མེ་ལྷ་གངས་དཀར་
- Mountain view from south above the rapeseed fields of Datong River Valley

Highest point
- Elevation: 5,254 m (17,238 ft)
- Prominence: 1,504 m (4,934 ft)
- Coordinates: 37°41′36″N 101°30′18″E

Geography
- Location within Qinghai
- Location: Menyuan Hui Autonomous County, Qinghai, China
- Parent range: Qilian Mountains

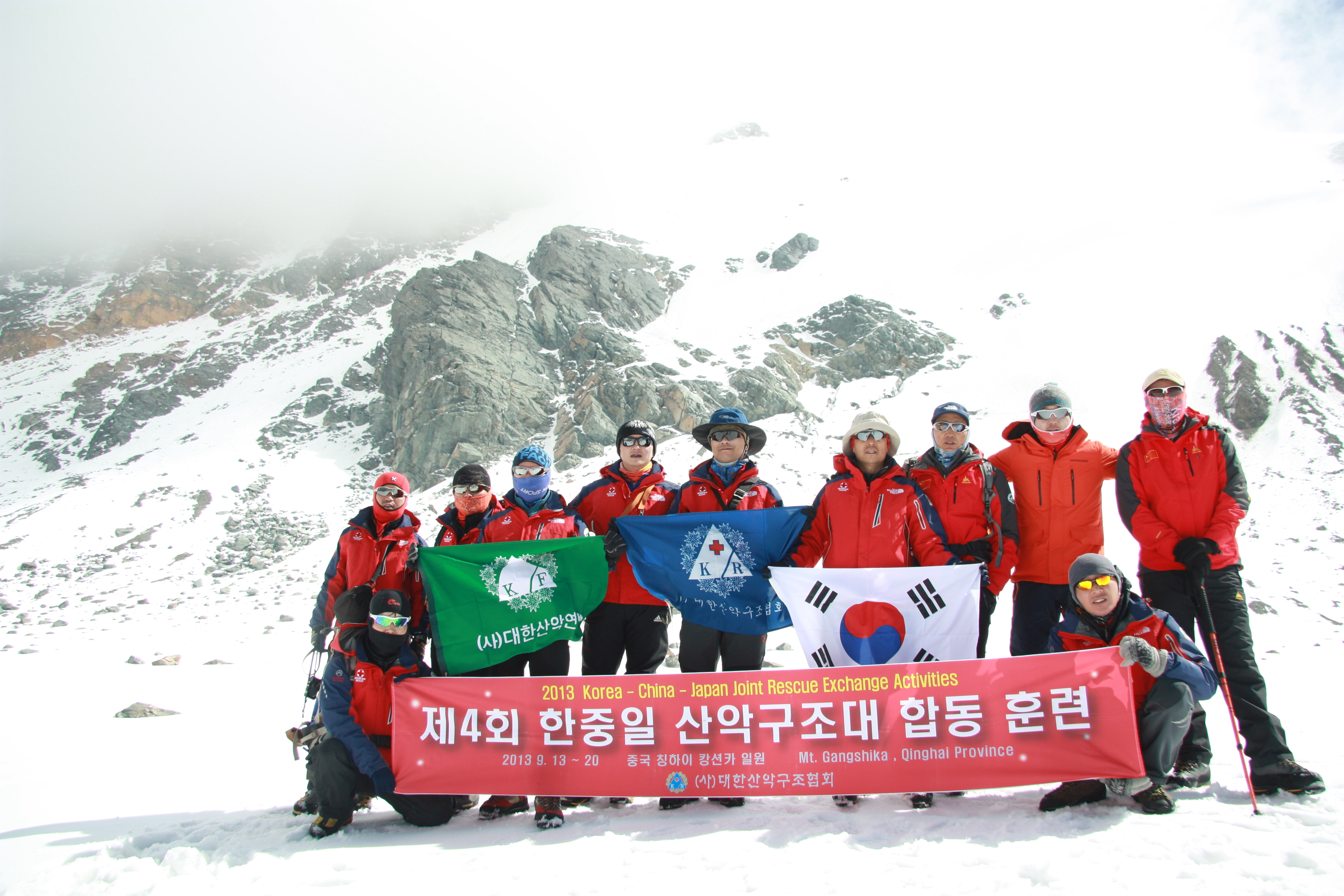
2013 Korea-China-Japan Joint Rescue Exchange Activities

Gang Ziska Snowy Peak also known as Gangshika Peak (simplified Chinese: 岗什卡雪峰; traditional Chinese: 崗什卡雪峰; pinyin: Gǎngshíkǎ Xuěfēng), is a 5,254 m (17,238 ft) high mountain peak in the eastern Qilian Mountains of northeastern Qinghai province. The mountain is located within Menyuan Hui Autonomous County of Haibei Prefecture, and is not far from the Gansu border. Ganshika is the highest peak in the Lenglong Ling (subrange) of the Qilian Mountains. Its southern slopes are drained by the Datong River and tributaries, while its northern slopes are drained by the Dongda He, an endorheic river terminating in Gansu near Jinchang.

The mountain possesses a popular climbing route via its glaciers, although Menyuan County is closed to foreigners without a permit. The nearest town is Qingshiju (青石咀镇), alternately Qingshizui (青石嘴), in Menyuan County.

== See also ==
- List of ultras of Tibet, East Asia and neighbouring areas
