= Jiuding Shan =

Mountain in Sichuan, China

- Location within China

Highest point
- Elevation: 4,969 m (16,302 ft)
- Prominence: 2,808 m (9,213 ft); Ranked 125th
- Listing: Ultra
- Coordinates: 31°32′36″N 103°51′12″E

Geography
- Location: Sichuan, China
- Parent range: Daxue Mountains

Jiuding Shan is a mountain in Sichuan, China. It is located in the Daxue Mountains, part of a complicated system of mountain ranges of western Sichuan, which itself is adjacent to the eastern edge of the Tibetan Plateau. Jiuding Shan has an elevation of 4,969 metres (16,302 ft) above sea level. By measure of topographic prominence, it is ranked 125th in the world.

== See also ==
- List of ultras of Tibet, East Asia and neighbouring areas
