= Yuzhu Peak =

Mountain in Qinghai, China

- Sob Gangri
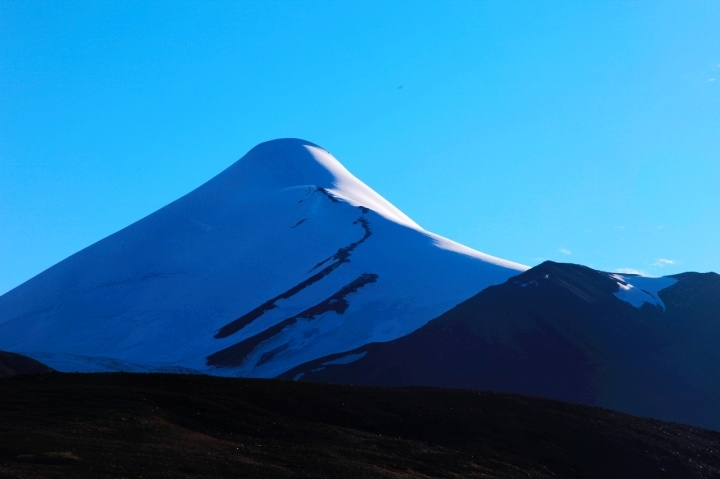

Highest point
- Elevation: 6,178 m (20,269 ft)
- Prominence: 1,674 m (5,492 ft)
- Listing: Ultra
- Coordinates: 35°39′09″N 94°15′03″E

Geography
- Location within China
- Location: Qinghai Province，China
- Parent range: Kunlun Mountains

Climbing
- Easiest route: snow/ice/glacier climb

Yuzhu Peak (Chinese: 玉珠峰), also known as Sob Gangri is a mountain in Qinghai Province, China. It belongs to the eastern part of the Kunlun Mountains (the Bokalyktag mountain range, 博卡雷克塔格山) and its height is 6,178 meters above sea level.

It can be seen from Qingzang Highway or Qingzang Railway, which run north and west of the mountain, and is known to be a mountain of relatively easy access.

== See also ==
- List of ultras of Tibet, East Asia and neighbouring areas

== Gallery ==
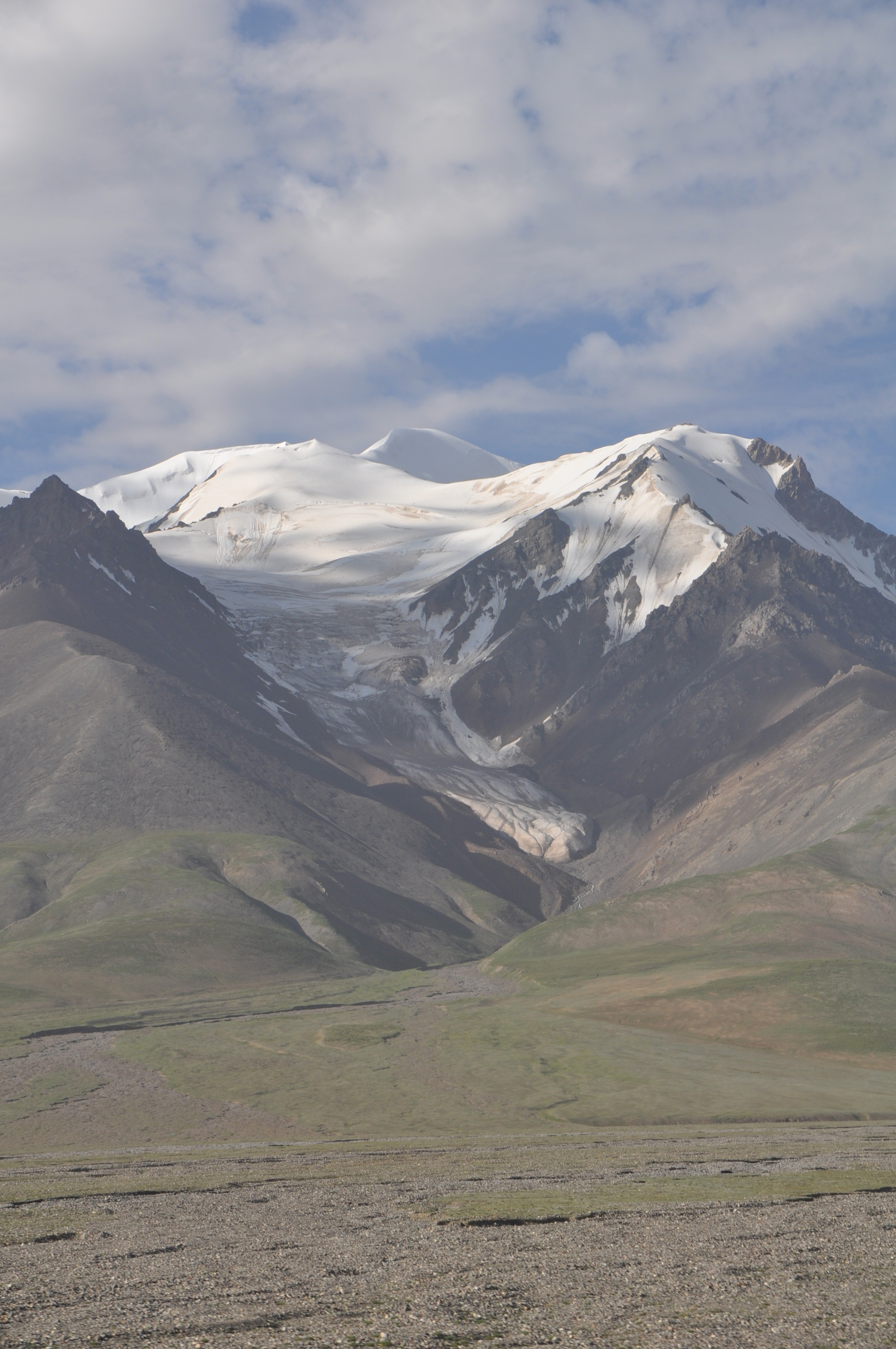
Yuzhu Peak and Its Glacier, Viewed from Qingzang Railway (July, 2010)
