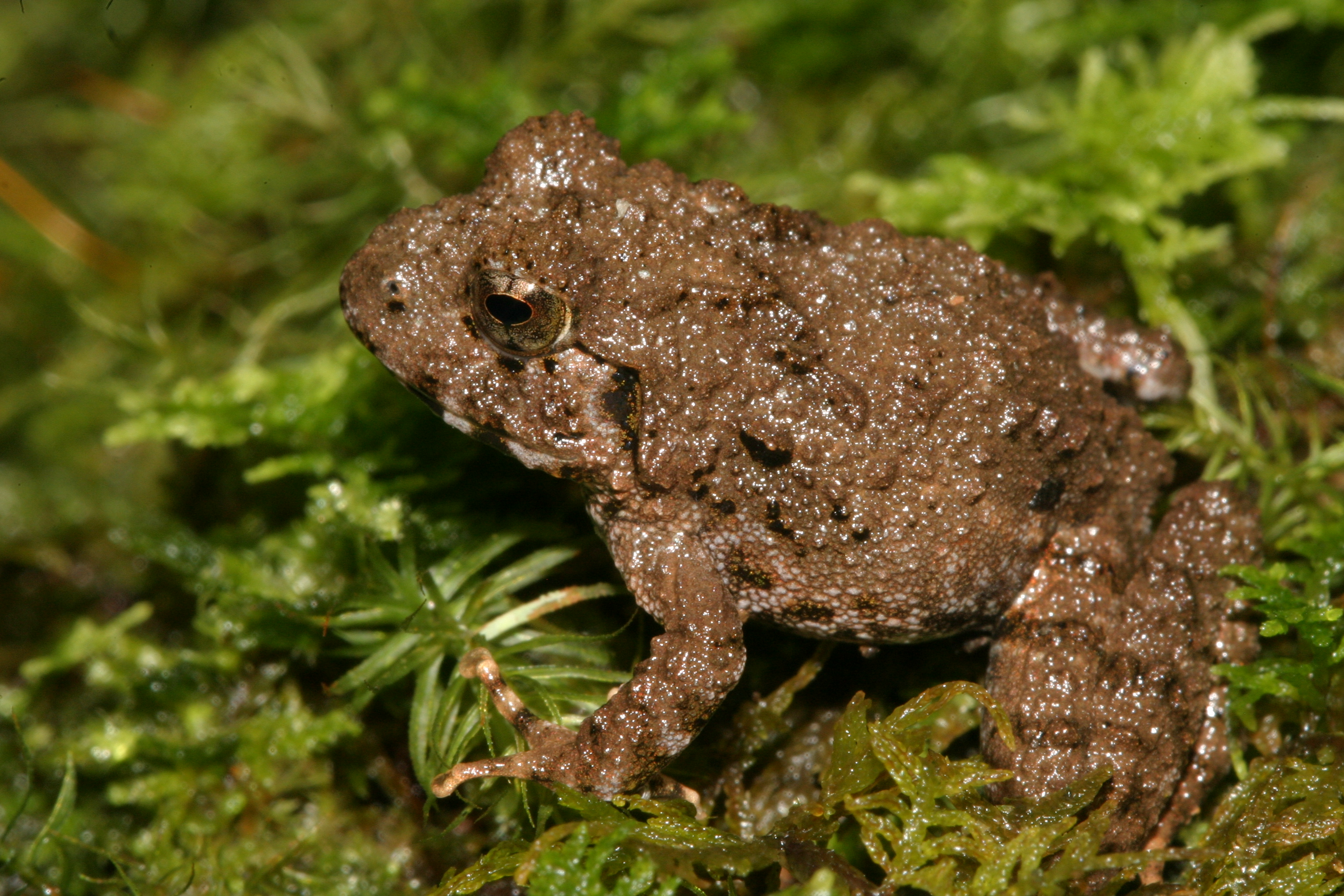

Conservation status
- Endangered (IUCN 3.1)

Scientific classification
- Kingdom: Animalia
- Phylum: Chordata
- Class: Amphibia
- Order: Anura
- Family: Ranixalidae
- Genus: Walkerana
- Species: W. phrynoderma

Binomial name
- Walkerana phrynoderma (Boulenger, 1882)

Synonyms
- Rana phrynoderma Boulenger, 1882; Indirana phrynoderma Boulenger, 1882

= Walkerana phrynoderma =

Species of amphibian

Walkerana phrynoderma is a species of frog endemic to the Anaimalai Hills, of the Western Ghats of Kerala and Tamil Nadu states in southern India. This species is known from Munnar, Eravikulam National Park, Valparai tea gardens, Anamalai Tiger Reserve, Grass Hills National Park and Palni Hills. It is a very rare terrestrial frog species associated with leaf-litter in tropical moist forest. It is threatened by habitat loss caused by subsistence wood collecting. It has the status of one of the "Top 100 Evolutionarily Distinct and Globally Endangered Amphibians".

This frog has been observed in the Anamalai Hills and nearby parts of the Cardamom Hills. It is nocturnal and terrestrial. It has been found in forests and grasslands near streams between 1200 and 1900 meters above sea level.

This frog's tadpoles do not live in the water. Instead, they move across wet rocks and moss using their tails and their back legs, which grow in at a younger age than those of other tadpoles.

The IUCN classifies this frog as endangered because of its limited range. This range includes some protected parks: Anamalai Tiger Reserve, Eravikulam National Park, and Parambikulam Tiger Reserve. Pesticide runoff from nearby farms also poses some threat, as does habitat loss associated with road and infrastructure construction. Scientists consider climate change a possible threat to this frog through alteration of the monsoon weather patterns that it needs to breed.

Scientists have not observed the fungus Batrachochytrium dendrobatidis on this frog, but they consider it a possible threat. Batrachochytrium dendrobatidis causes the fungal disease chytridiomycosis.
