= Liushi Shan =

Mountain in China

- Kunlun Goddess
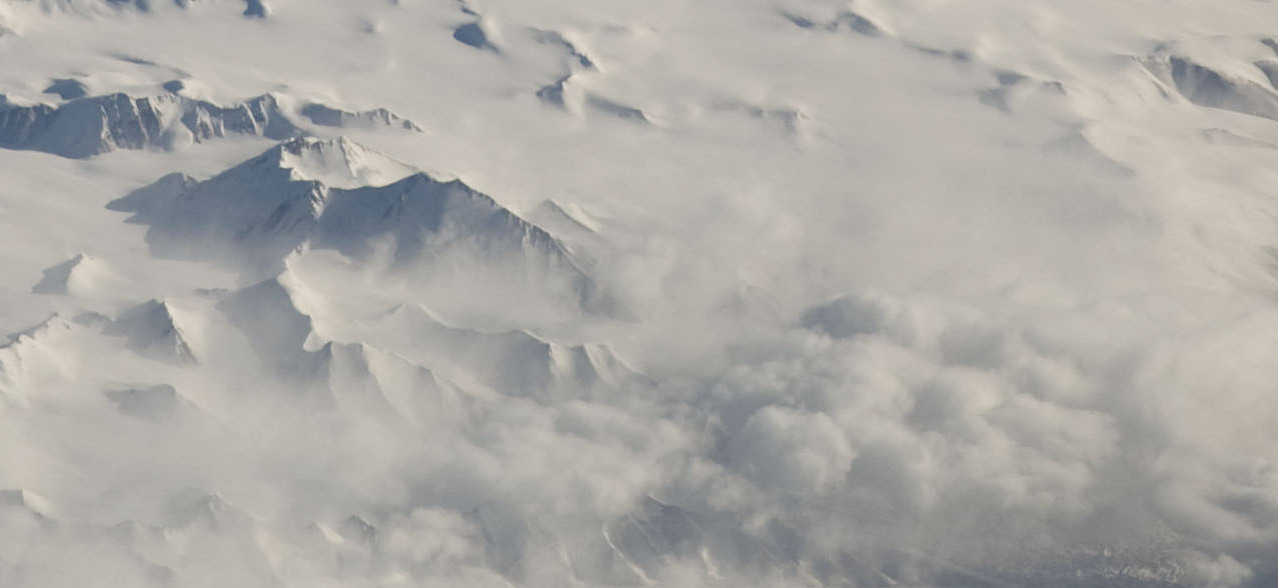

Highest point
- Elevation: 7,167 m (23,514 ft)
- Prominence: 1,946 m (6,385 ft)
- Listing: Ultra
- Coordinates: 35°18′57″N 80°54′57″E

Geography
- Location within China
- Location: Tibet and Xinjiang, China
- Parent range: Kunlun Mountains

Climbing
- First ascent: August 16, 1986

Liushi Shan (Chinese: 昆仑女神峰; pinyin: Kūnlún nǚshén fēng), also known as Kunlun Goddess Peak, is a mountain in the Kunlun Mountain Range in China. The mountain is located on the border of the Tibet and Xinjiang autonomous regions of China.

Liushi Shan has an elevation of 7,167 metres (23,514 ft) and is the highest mountain of the Kunlun Range.

== 1986 Summit Expedition ==
The mountain was first summited by a Japanese team from the Tokyo University Agriculture Alpine Club. The following is the American Alpine Club Entry from Kejiro Hayasaka.

Our expedition traveled from Urumqi via Kashgar to the western end of the Kunlun Mountains. Base Camp was some 60 kilometers east of Tansuihai at 5270 meters on the Litang River. This was established on July 20. From there it was still some 25 kilometers to the summit of P 7167. The most difficult part was carrying loads across the Doctor and Zhongfeng Glaciers. Camps I, II and III were placed at 5515, 6160 and 6670 meters on August 3, 10 and 12. Camp III was a snow cave. We climbed up the glacier on the south side to hit the east ridge where we had Camp III. We followed the east ridge to its junction with the south ridge. We fixed rope and prepared the route above Camp III for two days. At nine A.M. on August 16 Shinji Kobayashi, Shuya Nakashima, Tetsuya Baba, Yukimasa Numano and Masanori Sato left for the summit (7167 meters, 23,514 feet). On August 17, the second group, Kunio Obata, Takeshi Murata, Yukiko Kukuzawa, Mitsuhiro Sugawara, Dr. Shigeru Masuyama and I, also successfully reached the summit.

The name "P 7167" may have been a placeholder name for the peak referring to its height before it was named.

There has been no verified summit of Liushi Shan since this expedition.

== See also ==
- List of mountains by elevation
- List of ultras of Tibet, East Asia and neighbouring areas
- List of mountains in China
