= Kataklik Kangri =

Mountain peaks

Kataklik Kangri I & II
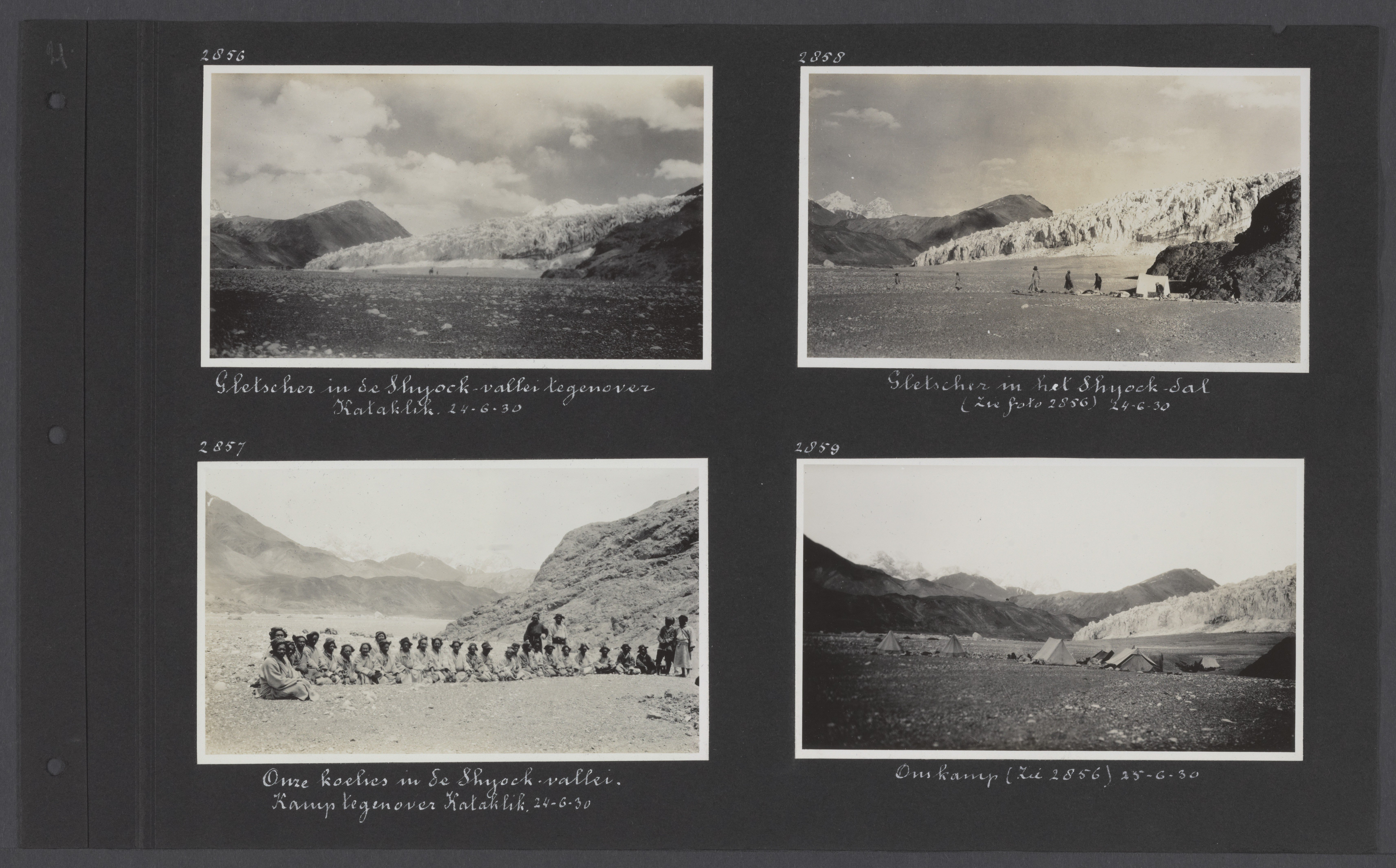
- Album sheet with four photos. Top left: Glacier in the Shyok Valley opposite Kataklik; lower left: the coolies of the expedition in the camp in the Shyok Valley opposite Kataklik; top right: a glacier in the Shyok Valley; bottom right: the expedition camp in the Shyok Valley. Photo album by Philips Christiaan Visser: Third Karakorum Expedition, Burma, Dutch East Indies 1930

Highest point
- Elevation: 6,897 m (22,628 ft)
- Prominence: 1,548 m (5,079 ft)
- Coordinates: 34°54′09″N 78°12′29″E

Geography
- Location within India Location within Ladakh
- 1 Kataklik Kangri I (6,897 m /22,628 ft); 2 Kataklik Kangri II (6,820 m /22,375 ft) Location in Ladakh
- Location: Aksai Chin/Ladakh

Climbing
- First ascent: No Records

Kataklik Kangri (or Kataklik Kangri I & II) are two of the highest mountains in the mountain group which are located in the east of the Shyok River's upper reaches, which lies in the far west of the Transhimalaya.

== Locations ==
Kataklik Kangri massif has two prominent peaks.

- Kataklik Kangri I is at 6,897 m /22,628 ft above sea level. It is located on the Line of Actual Control (armistice line) between Aksai Chin (China) and the Indian Union territory of Ladakh. The prominence is 1,548m/5,079 ft. The glaciers on its flanks are drained via Shyok River. (Coordinates: 34°56'29.4"N, 78°10'57.1"E)
- Kataklik Kangri II is at 6,820 m /22,375 ft above sea level. It is located 4.9 km south-southeast of Kataklik Kangri I. The prominence is 564m/1,850 ft. (Coordinates: 34°54'09.7"N, 78°12'25.3"E)

There are no records of ascents (for either peak) in the Himalayan Index. And till 2005, some explorers' travelogues claimed that the peaks were "completely unknown, never been attempted or explored".

The above heights and coordinates are supported by many sources, but disputed by German Wikipedia, which has the higher peak at the south location. This claim is supported by American military survey mapping, Digital Elevation Model data published by the Polar Geospatial Center and a list of summits at 8000ers.

== See also ==
- List of ultras of Tibet, East Asia and neighbouring areas
