= Altyn-Tagh =

Mountain range

- Altun Mountains, Altun Shan, A'erjin Shan, A-erh-chin Shan
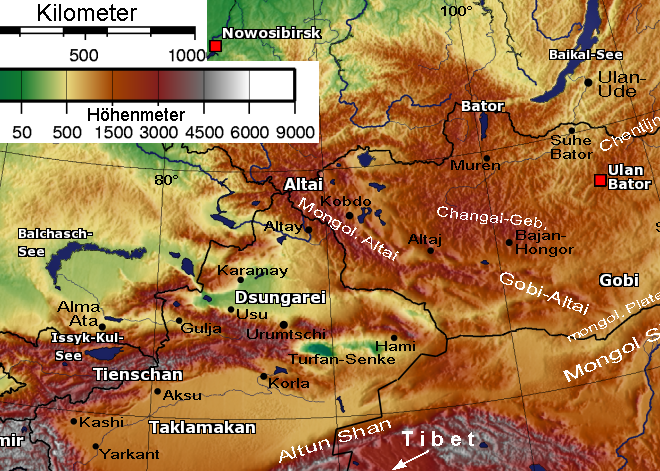
- Eastern part of Altun Shan at bottom of elevation map

Highest point
- Peak: Sulamutag Feng, Xinjiang
- Elevation: 6,245 m (20,489 ft)
- Coordinates: 37°55′N 87°23′E

Dimensions
- Length: 805 km (500 mi) WSW-ENE

Geography
- Country: China
- Provinces: Xinjiang; Qinghai; Gansu
- Range coordinates: 38°36′N 89°0′E
- Borders on: Kunlun Mountains; Qilian Mountains
- Biome: Desert

Altyn-Tagh, (Note: Chinese: 阿尔金山, romanized: Ā'ěr jīnshān; Kazakh: التىن تاۋ, romanized: Altyn Tau; Kyrgyz: التىن توو, romanized: Altyn Too; Uyghur: ئالتۇن تاغ, romanized: Altun Tagh) also called the Altun Mountains, is a mountain range in northwestern China that separates the eastern Tarim Basin from the Tibetan Plateau. The western third is wholly within Xinjiang, while the eastern part forms the border between Qinghai to the south, and Xinjiang and Gansu to the north.

Altun Shan, i.e. Altun Mountain, is also the name of a 5,830-metre (19,130 ft) mountain near the eastern end of the range, the highest point in Gansu.

== Etymology ==
Altyn Tag means Gold Mountain in Turkic, and Jin Shan (金山) is Chinese for Gold Mountain.

== Geography ==
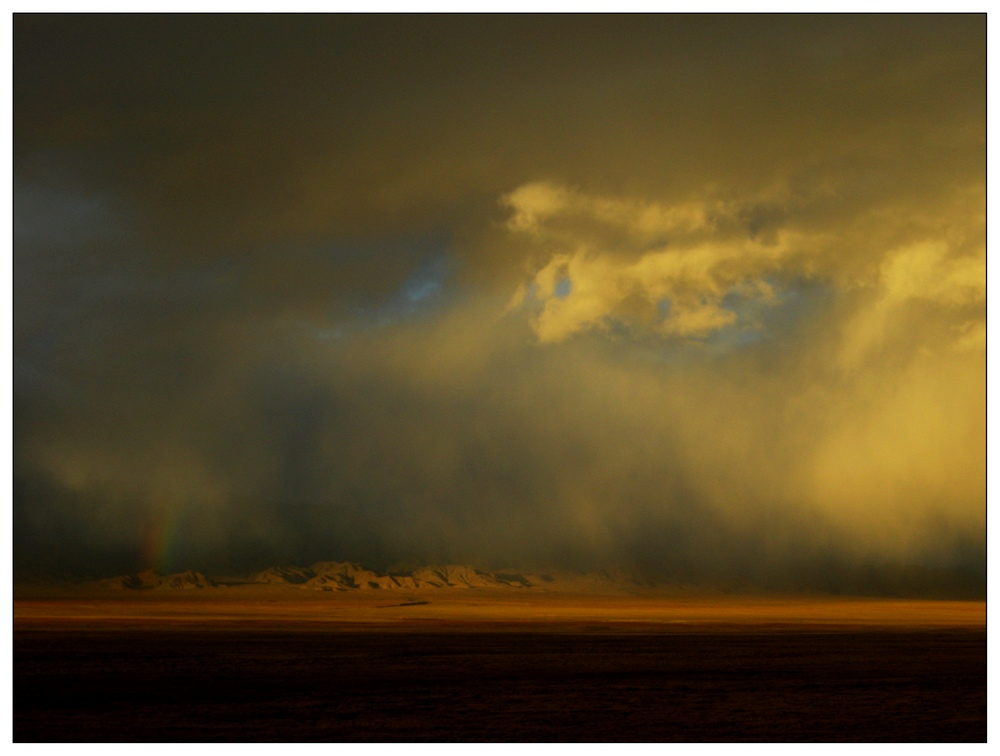
Altyn Tagh at dusk

A series of mountain ranges run along the northern edge of the Tibetan Plateau, with the Kunlun Mountains located in the West. About halfway across the south side of the Tarim Basin, the Altyn-Tagh Range diverges northeast while the Kunluns continue directly east, forming a relatively narrow "V". (Note: See e.g. the map in Fig. 1 in Meng & Fang's Cenozoic tectonic development of the Qaidam Basin in the northeastern Tibetan Plateau) Inside the "V" are a number of endorheic basins. The eastern end of the Altyn-Shan is near the Dangjin Pass on the Dunhuang-Golmud road in far western Gansu. East of the Altyn-Tagh the border range rises to the Qilian Mountains. The range separates the Tarim Basin, to the north, and Lake Ayakkum, to the south. The range can be divided into three portions. The southwest portion borders the Kunlun Mountains and is very rugged, with peaks reaching more than 6,100 metres (20,000 ft) and many perennial snow fields. The central portion is lower in elevation, around 4,000 metres (13,000 ft). The eastern portion is higher in elevation, about 5,000 metres (16,000 ft) and consists of a group of smaller ranges oriented in a south-east to north-west trend.

Along the northern side of the mountains ran the main Silk Road trade route from China proper to the Tarim Basin and westward. The Altyn-Tagh and Qilians were sometimes called the Nan Shan ('south mountains') because they were south of the main route. Near the east end of the Altyn-Shan, the Gansu or Hexi Corridor ends and the Silk Road splits. One branch follows the Altyn-Tagh along the south side of the Tarim Basin while the other follows the north side.

The southwestern part of the Altyn-Tagh range reaches snowy peaks of up to 6,245 metres (20,489 ft), although it descends to an average of 4,000 metres (13,000 ft) in the narrow middle and eventually rises up to average 5,000 metres (16,000 ft) as it meets the Qilian Mountains.

There are a dearth of rivers and streams in these mountains, due to the aridity of the region. The western portion has some small streams that either head north into the desert or south into Lake Ayakkum. The remainder of the range is lacking in rivers.

== Intermontane endorheic basins ==
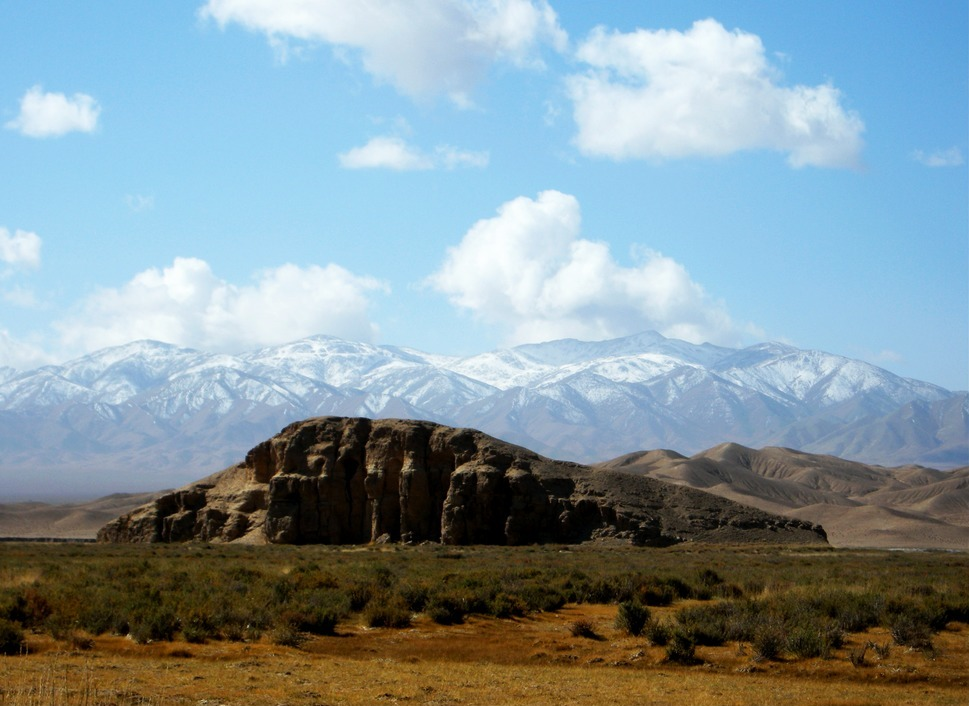
Altyn Tagh landscape

Inside the V-shaped area between the Altyn-Tagh and the main Kunlun range (which in this area is called Arka-Tagh) a number of endorheic basins are located.

Within southeastern Xinjiang, the main of these basins is the Kumkol Basin (Chinese: 库木库里盆地; pinyin: Kùmùkùlǐ Péndì) (Note: The Chinese-based spelling (pinyin) for this place name, "Kumukuli Basin" is often used in English. When trying to produce a Turkic-like spelling for this name, authors occasionally transcribe it as "Kumukol Basin", as in the map in Fig. 2 in Meng & Fang's Cenozoic tectonic development of the Qaidam Basin in the northeastern Tibetan Plateau, but more often as "Kumkol", or "Kumkuli".)

The two main lakes in this basin are the saline Lake Aqqikkol (also Ajig Kum Kul, Achak-kum; Chinese: 阿其克库勒湖; pinyin: Āqíkèkùlè Hú; 37°05′N, 88°25′E, 4,250 metres (13,940 ft) elevation) and Lake Ayakum (Chinese: 阿牙克库木湖; pinyin: Āyákèkùmù hú; 37°30′N, 89°30′E; elevation 3,876 metres (12,717 ft)). These lakes are two of the few noticeable bodies of water in this extremely arid area; the area around them is officially protected as the Altun Shan Nature Reserve.

Farther east, in northwestern Qinghai, the much larger Qaidam Basin starts between the Altyn-Tagh and the Kunlun and extends almost to the east side of the plateau; the Altyn-Tagh separates the west side of this basin from the Kumtagh Desert.

== Major Peaks ==
The four highest peaks are Sulamutag Feng (6,245 metres (20,489 ft)), Yusupu Aleketag Shan (6,065 metres (19,898 ft)), Altun Shan (5,830 metres (19,130 ft)) and Kogantag (4,800 metres (15,700 ft)).

== Economic development ==
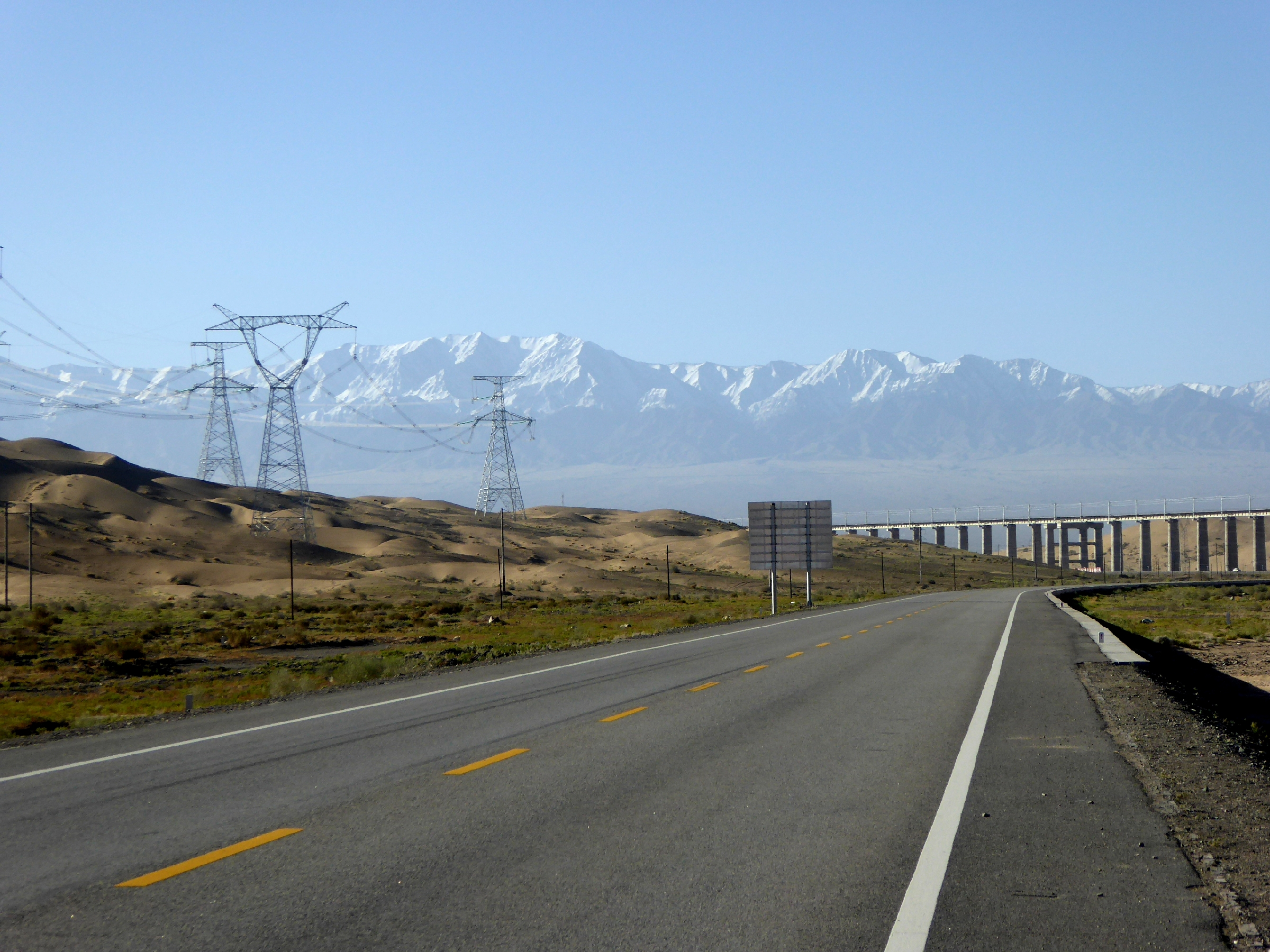
Altyn Mountains from Aksai County, Gansu

China National Highway 315 crosses the Altyn-Tagh on its way between Qinghai and Xinjiang.

The Golmud-Korla Railway crosses the Altyn-Tagh as well. The project, involving the construction of the 13.195 km-long Altyn-Tagh Tunnel (阿尔金山隧道), was completed in 2020.

== See also ==
- List of ultras of Tibet, East Asia and neighbouring areas
