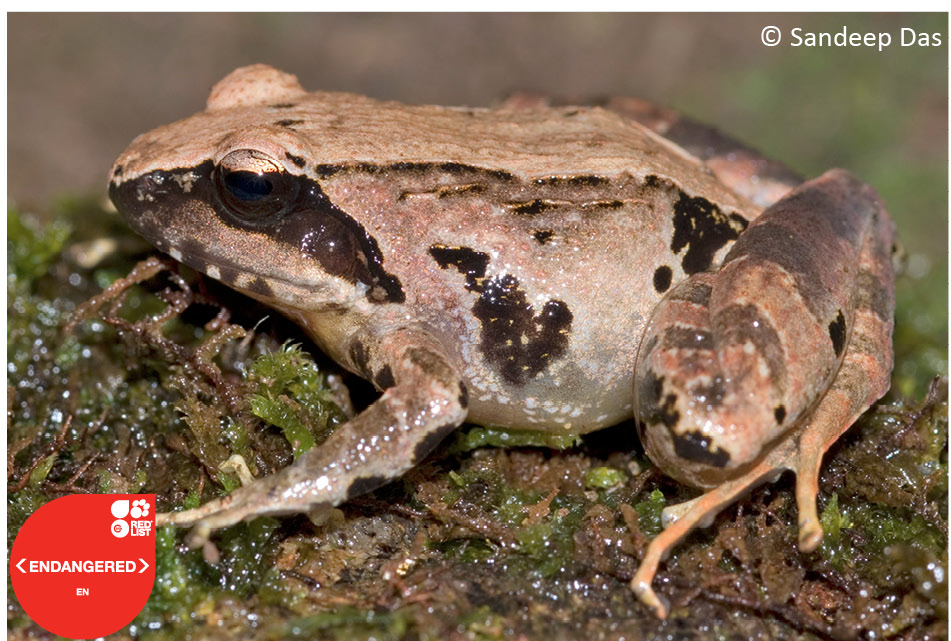
- Walkerana diplosticta – type species

Scientific classification
- Kingdom: Animalia
- Phylum: Chordata
- Class: Amphibia
- Order: Anura
- Family: Ranixalidae
- Genus: Walkerana; Dahanukar, Modak, Krutha, Nameer, Padhye, and Molur, 2016

Type species
- Ixalus diplostictus Günther, 1876

Synonyms
- Sallywalkerana Dahanukar, Modak, Krutha, Nameer, Padhye, and Molur, 2016 – unnecessary replacement name

= Walkerana =

Genus of frogs

Walkerana is a genus of frogs in the family Ranixalidae. The genus is endemic to the Western Ghats in the states of Kerala and Tamil Nadu, India. It was erected in 2016 to host three species of Indirana that represented a genetically and morphologically distinct clade within the then broadly defined Indirana. Until Walkerana muduga was described in 2020, the genus was only known from the southernmost part of the Western Ghats south of the Palghat Gap.

== Etymology ==
This genus is named for Sally Walker, conservationist from the Zoo Outreach Organisation. The genus was then renamed into Sallywalkerana because of homonymy with the cricket genus Walkerana Otte and Perez-Gelabert, 2009, but the latter may be nomen nudum.

== Description ==
Walkerana is genetically distant clade within the family Ranixalidae. It differs from its sister taxon Indirana in having extremely reduced webbing, with one phalange free of webbing on first and second toes (none in Indirana), and three phalanges free on the fourth toe (2–2½ in Indirana). Furthermore, the first finger is shorter than the second one in Walkerana, while in Indirana (with the exception of I. leithii) they are of equal length or the first finger is longer than the second.

== Species ==
There are four recognized species:

- Walkerana diplosticta (Günther, 1876)
- Walkerana leptodactyla (Boulenger, 1882)
- Walkerana muduga Dinesh, Vijayakumar, Ramesh, Jayarajan, Chandramouli, and Shanker, 2020
- Walkerana phrynoderma (Boulenger, 1882)

Dinesh and colleagues have identified one additional species based on one specimen from north of the Palghat Gap, but did not describe it because of the poor preservation of the specimen in question.

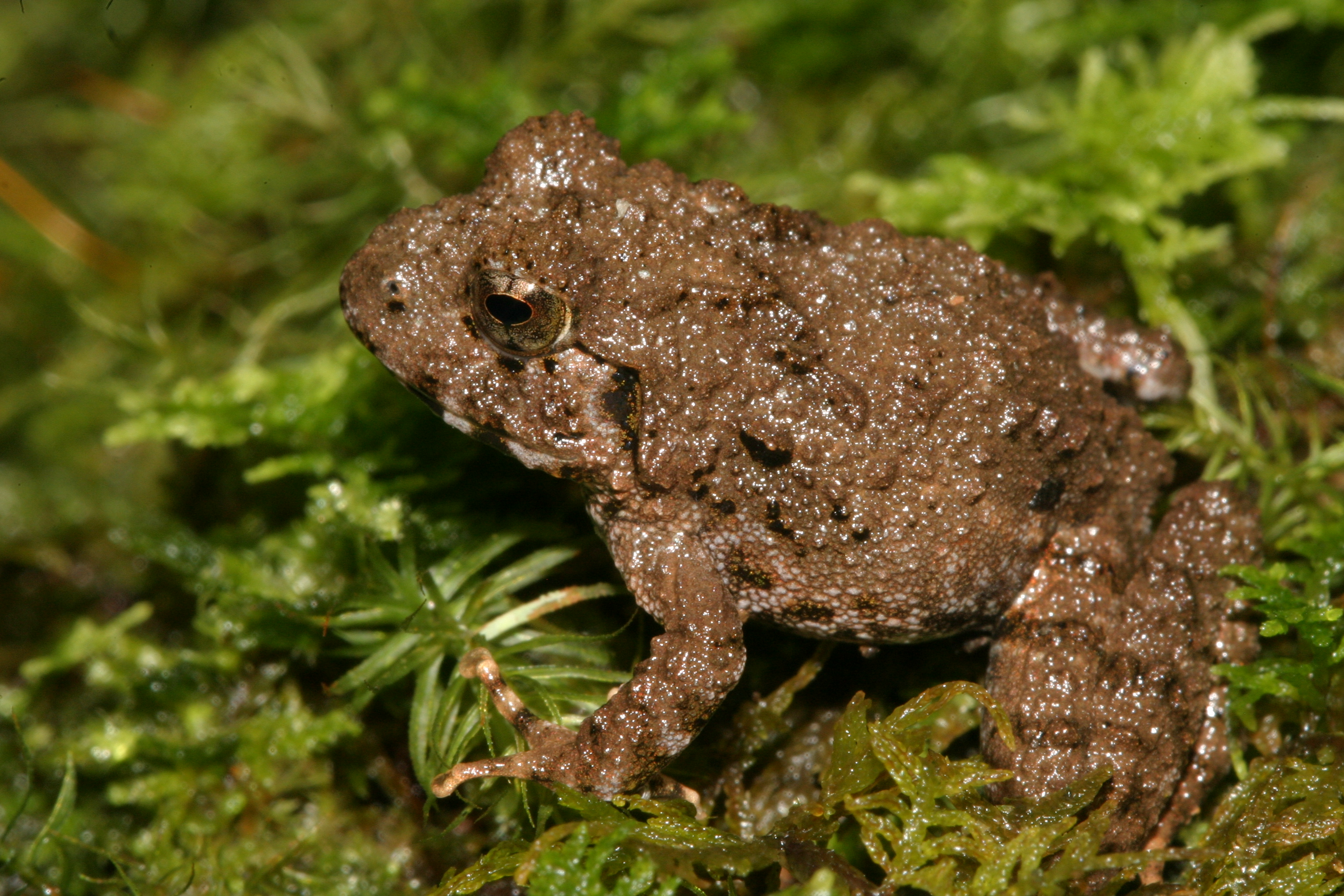
Walkerana phrynoderma
