= Mush Muztagh =

Mountain in Xinjiang, China

- Location within China

Highest point
- Elevation: 6,638 m (21,778 ft)
- Prominence: 1,631 m (5,351 ft)
- Isolation: 34.52 km (21.45 mi)
- Listing: Mountains of China; Ultra
- Coordinates: 36°3′N 80°7′E

Geography
- Country: China
- Parent range: Kunlun

Mush Muztagh is a mountain in Xinjiang, China. It is an ultra-prominent peak and is the 456th highest in Asia. It has an elevation of 6,638 m (21,778 ft).

== See also ==
- List of ultras of Tibet, East Asia and neighbouring areas
