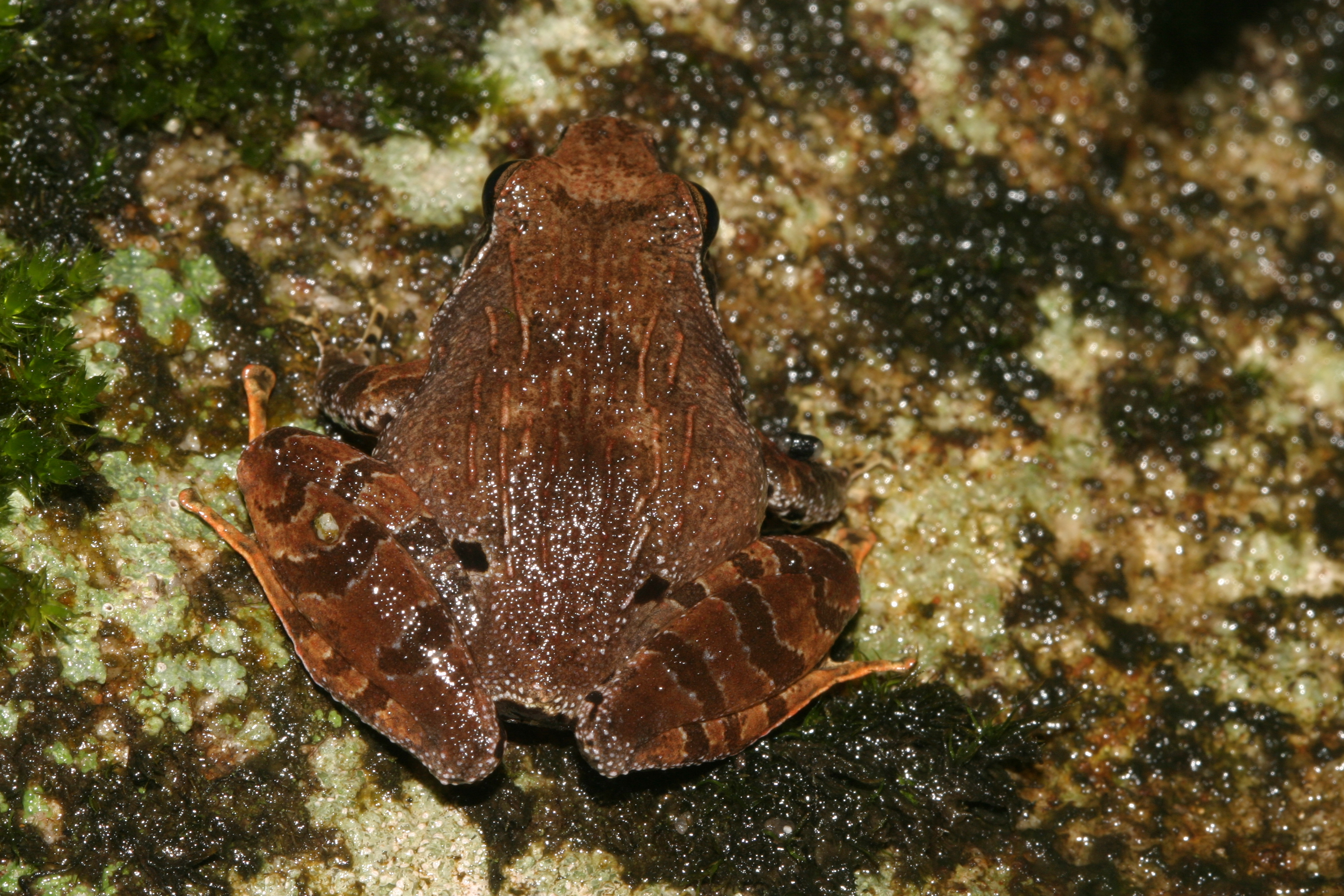

Conservation status
- Near Threatened (IUCN 3.1)

Scientific classification
- Kingdom: Animalia
- Phylum: Chordata
- Class: Amphibia
- Order: Anura
- Family: Ranixalidae
- Genus: Walkerana
- Species: W. diplosticta

Binomial name
- Walkerana diplosticta (Günther, 1876)

Synonyms
- Ixalus diplostictus Günther, 1876 "1875"; Rana diplosticta (Günther, 1876); Indirana diplosticta (Günther, 1876); Ranixalus diplosticta (Günther, 1876); Sallywalkerana diplosticta (Günther, 1876)

= Walkerana diplosticta =

Species of amphibian

Walkerana diplosticta, also known as the spotted leaping frog, Malabar Indian frog, rufous leaf-hopper frog, and Günther's frog, is a species of frog in the family Ranixalidae. It is endemic to the Western Ghats south of the Palghat Gap and only known with certainty from the states of Kerala and Tamil Nadu, India. Localities with confirmed records include the Kalakkad Mundanthurai Tiger Reserve.

== Description ==
Walkerana diplosticta is a relatively small frog reaching a snout–vent length of about 35 mm (1.4 in); among specimens with species identification confirmed with genetics methods, two adult males measure 24 and 28 mm (0.9 and 1.1 in) and two adult females 23 and 26 mm (0.9 and 1.0 in) in snout–urostyle length. The canthus rostralis is distinct. The tympanum is distinct and relatively large. The finger and toe tips bear discs. The toes are partially webbed. The dorsum is grey-pink or reddish-brown. The snout is paler and bordered by dark bar between the eyes. A brown stripe runs from the snout to the shoulder. The groin has brown spots. The ventrum is light brown with darker spots. The limbs are cross-barred. Dorsal skin is smooth.

== Habitat and conservation ==
Walkerana diplosticta was assessed by the International Union for Conservation of Nature in 2022. They classify this frog as near-threatened because its range is subject to continuing habitat degradation. Said range does include a protected park: Kalakad Mundanthurai Tiger Reserve.

Specific threats include disturbance from the many visitors who make an annual religious pilgrimages to the area and pollution. Scientists also think climate change could hurt this frog because its high-elevation habitat would impede migration to cooler areas.

Scientists also believe the fungus Batrachochytrium dendrobatidis could pose a threat. Batrachochytrium dendrobatidis causes the fungal disease chytridiomycosis.
