= Sulamutag Feng =

Mountain in Xinjiang, China

- Location within China

Highest point
- Elevation: 6,245 m (20,489 ft)
- Prominence: 2,028 m (6,654 ft)
- Isolation: 152.21 km (94.58 mi)
- Listing: Mountains of China; Ultra
- Coordinates: 37°55′N 87°23′E

Geography
- Country: China
- Region: Xinjiang
- Parent range: Altun Shan

Sulamutag Feng is a mountain located in Xinjiang, China. It is an ultra-prominent peak and is the 193rd highest in Asia. It has an elevation of 6,245 m (20,489 ft).

== See also ==
- List of ultras of Tibet, East Asia and neighbouring areas
