= Shahi Kangri =

Mountain peak

- Location within India Location within Ladakh

Highest point
- Elevation: 6,934 m (22,749 ft)
- Prominence: 1,644 m (5,394 ft)
- Coordinates: 35°10′15″N 77°49′50″E

Geography
- Location: Ladakh Range

Climbing
- First ascent: 2022

Shahi Kangri is a mountain peak located at 6,934m (22,749ft) above sea level in the far west of the Transhimalaya.

== Location ==
The peak is located in the Shyok catchment area, west of Aksai Chin (China) in the Leh district of Union territory of Ladakh (India). The prominence is 1,644 m (5,394 ft).

== Climbing history ==
In 2017, a climbing attempt was made by Divyesh Muni, his wife Vineeta Muni, Rajesh Gadgil, Dinesh Koday, Ratnesh, and Roshmin Mahendru. But it was not successful.

On 15 June 2022, Expedition team of 55 men Indian Army led by Colonel Shivesh Singh and mentored by Brigadier Saurabh Singh Shekhawat tested boundaries of man vs nature by scaling never climbed before Silver Peak and challenging Shahi Kangri in an expedition of over two month.

== See also ==
- List of ultras of Tibet, East Asia and neighbouring areas
