= Menyuan Hui Autonomous County =

Menyuan County 门源县 · مٍیُوًا · འཇུ་ལག་རྫོང་།
- Autonomous County
- 门源回族自治县 · مٍیُوًا خُوِذُو ذِجِشِیًا · སེམས་ཉིད་ཧུའེ་རིགས་རང་སྐྱོང་ཞན། Hualong Hui Autonomous County
- A train on the Lanzhou–Xinjiang high-speed railway at Menyuan Station in 2015

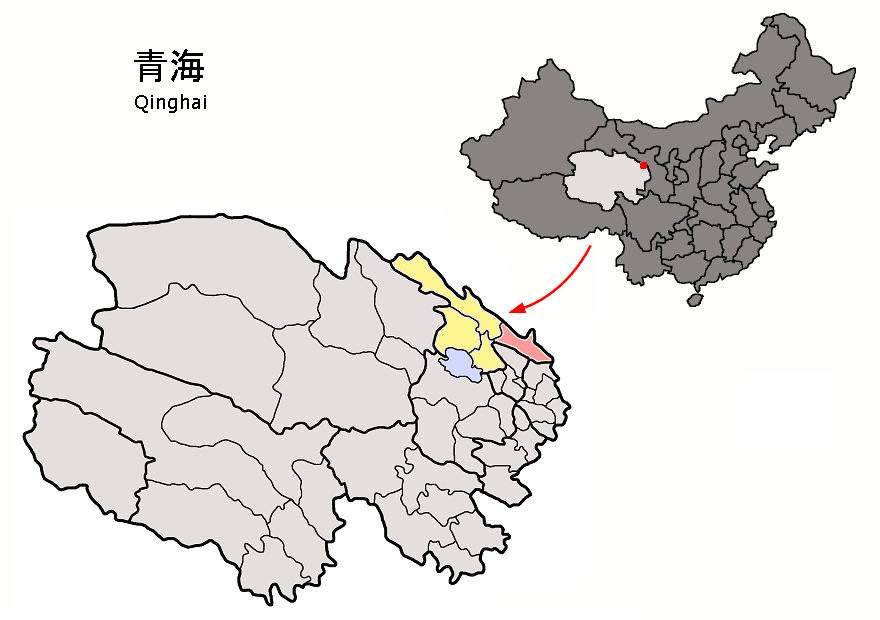
- Location of Menyuan County (red) within Haibei Prefecture (yellow) and Qinghai

- Location of the seat in Qinghai
- Country: China
- Province: Qinghai
- Autonomous prefecture: Haibei
- County seat: Haomen Town

Area
  - Total: 6,381.65 km^{2} (2,463.97 sq mi)

Population (2020)
  - Total: 138,335
  - Density: 21.6770/km^{2} (56.1432/sq mi)
- Time zone: UTC+8 (China Standard)
- Website: www.menyuan.gov.cn

Menyuan Hui Autonomous County

Chinese name
- Simplified Chinese: 门源回族自治县
- Traditional Chinese: 門源回族自治縣
Transcriptions
Standard Mandarin
- Hanyu Pinyin: Ményuán Huízú Zìzhìxiàn

Tibetan name
- Tibetan: སེམས་ཉིད་ཧུའེ་རིགས་རང་སྐྱོང་ཞན། or འཇུ་ལག་རྫོང་།

Mongolian name
- Mongolian script: ᠮᠧᠨ ᠶᠤᠸᠠᠨ ᠬᠣᠲᠣᠩ ᠦᠨᠳᠦᠰᠦᠲᠡᠨ ᠦ ᠥᠪᠡᠷᠲᠡᠭᠡᠨ ᠵᠠᠰᠠᠬᠤ ᠰᠢᠶᠠᠨ

Menyuan Hui Autonomous County (simplified Chinese: 门源回族自治县; traditional Chinese: 門源回族自治縣; pinyin: Ményuán Huízú Zìzhìxiàn, Xiao'erjing: مٍیُوًا خُوِذُو ذِجِشِیًا; Tibetan: སེམས་ཉིད་ཧུའེ་རིགས་རང་སྐྱོང་ཞན།) is a county in the northeast of Qinghai Province, China, bordering Gansu Province to the north. It is under the administration of Haibei Tibetan Autonomous Prefecture. Menyuan is situated on the Datong River between the Qilian Mountains and Daban Mountains. Gangshiqia Peak rises dramatically in the north of the county. It used to be called Menyuan (亹源) in Chinese, with a different first character from the current name.

== Administrative divisions ==
Haiyan County is made up of 4 towns, 7 townships, and 1 ethnic township:

Name	Simplified Chinese	Hanyu Pinyin	Tibetan	Wylie	Administrative division code	Notes
Towns
Haomen Town (Julag Town)	浩门镇	Hàomén Zhèn	འཇུ་ལག་གྲོང་རྡལ།	'ju lag grong rdal	632221100	
Qingshiju Town (Dê'gyaitiubur Town)	青石咀镇	Qīngshíjǔ Zhèn	སྡེ་བརྒྱད་དེའུ་འབུར་གྲོང་རྡལ།	sde brgyad de'u 'bur grong rdal	632221101	
Quankou Town (Xartang Town)	泉口镇	Quánkǒu Zhèn	ཤར་ཐང་གྲོང་རྡལ།	shar thang grong rdal	632221102	
Dongchuan Town	东川镇	Dōngchuān Zhèn			632221103	
Townships
Beishan Township (Qangri Township)	北山乡	Běishān Xiāng	བྱང་རི་ཞང་།	byang ri zhang	632221200	
Malian Township	麻莲乡	Málián Xiāng			632221201	
Xitan Township (Nubtang Township)	西滩乡	Xītān Xiāng	ནུབ་ཐང་ཞང་།	nub thang zhang	632221202	
Yintian Township (Sibxing Township)	阴田乡	Yīntián Xiāng	སྲིབ་ཞིང་ཞང་།	srib zhing zhang	632221203	
Xianmi Township (Sêmnyi Township)	仙米乡	Xiānmǐ Xiāng	སེམས་ཉིད་ཞང་།	sems nyid zhang	632221204	
Zhugu Township (Chuku Township)	珠固乡	Zhūgù Xiāng	དྲུ་གུ་ཞང་།	dru gu zhang	632221205	
Sujitan Township (Soi'gyitang Township)	苏吉滩乡	Sūjítān Xiāng	བསོད་སྐྱིད་ཐང་ཞང་།	bsod skyid thang zhang	632221206	
Ethnic township
Huangcheng Mongol Ethnic Township	皇城蒙古族乡	Huángchéng Ménggǔzú Xiāng			632221207	(Mongolian) ᠬᠤᠸᠠᠩ ᠴᠧᠩ ᠮᠣᠩᠭᠣᠯ ᠦᠨᠳᠦᠰᠦᠲᠡᠨ ᠦ ᠰᠢᠶᠠᠩ

Others:

- Menyuan Prison (门源监狱)
- Menyuan Stallion Ranch (门源种马场)

== Climate ==
Climate data for Menyuan, elevation 2,850 m (9,350 ft), (1991–2020 normals, extremes 1991–present)
Month	Jan	Feb	Mar	Apr	May	Jun	Jul	Aug	Sep	Oct	Nov	Dec	Year
Record high °C (°F)	11.2 (52.2)	15.6 (60.1)	21.5 (70.7)	28.2 (82.8)	26.1 (79.0)	26.6 (79.9)	31.7 (89.1)	29.5 (85.1)	26.0 (78.8)	21.2 (70.2)	14.8 (58.6)	8.9 (48.0)	31.7 (89.1)
Mean daily maximum °C (°F)	−1.8 (28.8)	2.2 (36.0)	6.6 (43.9)	11.8 (53.2)	15.4 (59.7)	18.5 (65.3)	20.7 (69.3)	20.1 (68.2)	16.1 (61.0)	10.5 (50.9)	4.3 (39.7)	−1.1 (30.0)	10.3 (50.5)
Daily mean °C (°F)	−12.0 (10.4)	−7.6 (18.3)	−2.0 (28.4)	3.6 (38.5)	7.7 (45.9)	11.2 (52.2)	13.2 (55.8)	12.3 (54.1)	8.4 (47.1)	2.5 (36.5)	−5.0 (23.0)	−11.1 (12.0)	1.8 (35.2)
Mean daily minimum °C (°F)	−19.5 (−3.1)	−15.3 (4.5)	−8.7 (16.3)	−3.0 (26.6)	1.2 (34.2)	4.8 (40.6)	6.8 (44.2)	6.3 (43.3)	3.1 (37.6)	−3.0 (26.6)	−11.3 (11.7)	−18.1 (−0.6)	−4.7 (23.5)
Record low °C (°F)	−29.6 (−21.3)	−28.8 (−19.8)	−22.1 (−7.8)	−16.3 (2.7)	−10.0 (14.0)	−2.6 (27.3)	−0.6 (30.9)	−3.7 (25.3)	−8.1 (17.4)	−15.9 (3.4)	−26.8 (−16.2)	−34.5 (−30.1)	−34.5 (−30.1)
Average precipitation mm (inches)	2.0 (0.08)	4.5 (0.18)	16.4 (0.65)	34.1 (1.34)	67.5 (2.66)	82.6 (3.25)	89.2 (3.51)	115.4 (4.54)	83.9 (3.30)	26.6 (1.05)	5.7 (0.22)	2.0 (0.08)	529.9 (20.86)
Average precipitation days (≥ 0.1 mm)	3.3	4.4	9.1	10.4	14.4	17.8	17.4	17.9	16.8	9.7	3.6	2.5	127.3
Average snowy days	4.6	6.8	11.9	10.9	5.8	0.4	0.1	0.2	1.1	7.3	5.0	3.7	57.8
Average relative humidity (%)	50	48	52	55	60	66	72	74	74	68	60	54	61
Mean monthly sunshine hours	202.8	196.9	218.7	219.2	225.0	209.9	212.6	198.3	170.8	202.2	214.3	204.8	2,475.5
Percentage possible sunshine	66	64	58	55	51	48	48	48	47	59	71	69	57
Source: China Meteorological Administration

== Transportation ==
- Lanzhou–Xinjiang High-Speed Railway (Menyuan railway station)
- China National Highway 227

== See also ==
- List of administrative divisions of Qinghai
- Gangshika Peak
