= Hkaru Bum =

- Location within Myanmar

Highest point
- Elevation: 3,657 m (11,998 ft)
- Prominence: 1,914 m (6,280 ft)
- Listing: List of Ultras of Tibet, East Asia and neighbouring areas
- Coordinates: 27°8′45″N 98°9′1″E

Geography
- Location: Kachin State, Myanmar

Climbing
- First ascent: unknown
- Easiest route: climb

Hkaru Bum, is a high mountain located in Kachin State, Burma.

== Geography ==
Hkaru Bum is part of a range running from north to south west of the N'Mai River.

The nearest village is Khaunglanhpu, located about 22 km to the ESE.

== See also ==
- List of ultras of Tibet, East Asia and neighbouring areas
- List of mountains in Burma
