= Datong River =

River in China

Coordinates: 36°20′23″N 102°50′14″E

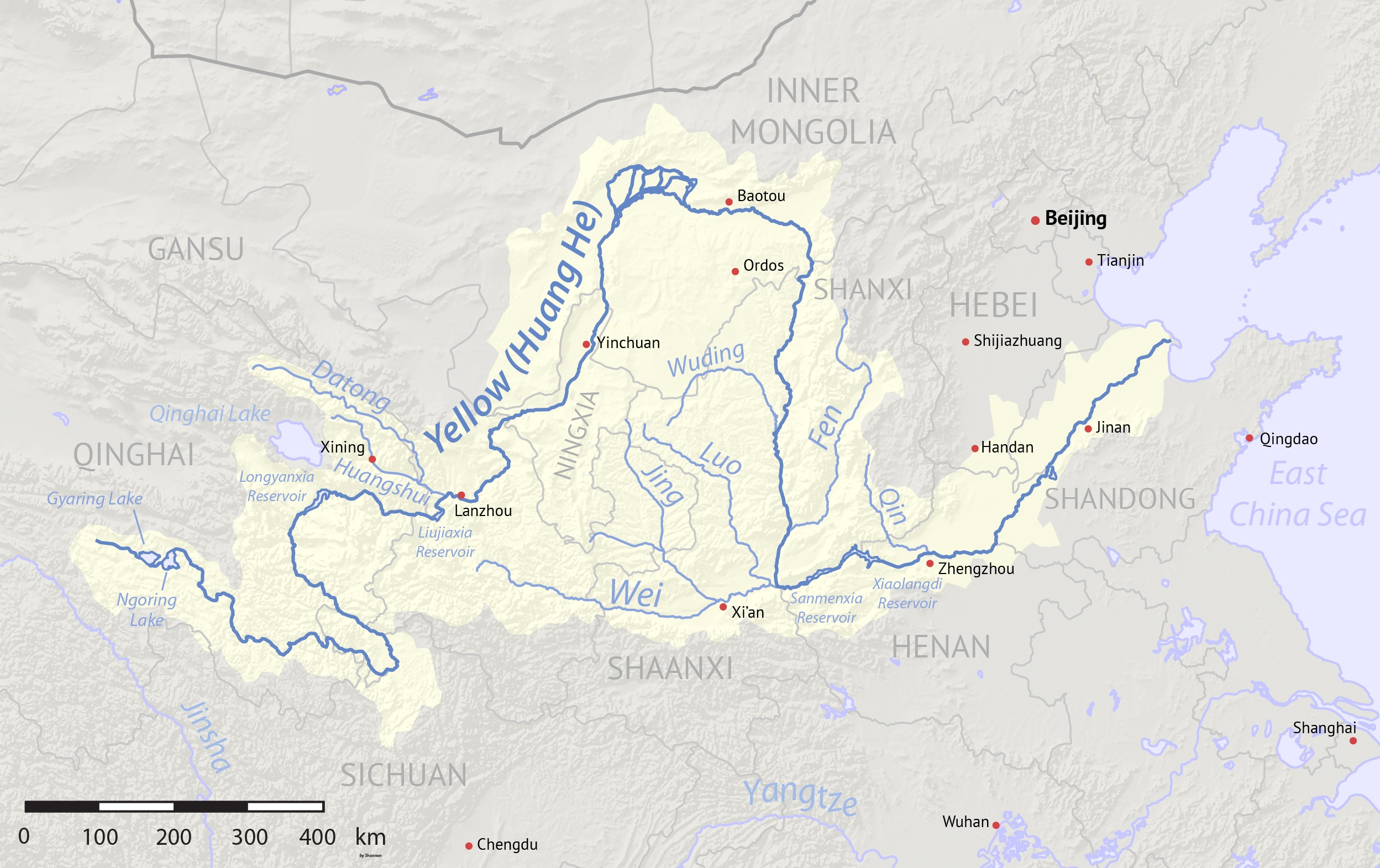
The Datong River, just west of Lanzhou, shown as longer than the Huangshui River (to the south)

The Datong River (Chinese: 大通河; pinyin: Dàtōng hé), known as the Julak Chu (Tibetan: འཇུ་ལག་ཆུ་) in Amdo Tibetan, is a river of Qinghai in the Yellow River basin. It has a total length of 560 kilometres (350 mi), and a basin area of 15,130 square kilometres (5,840 sq mi). It has an average annual flow of 90.5 cubic meters per second. It was previously spelled Tatung in English.

The river forms in Tianjun County, part of Qinghai Province's Haixi Mongol and Tibetan Autonomous Prefecture. It then flows easterly separating the Qilian Mountains from the Daban Mountains. The main centre of population along its length here is Menyuan. The Datong River meets the Huangshui River at Qinghai's border with Gansu. While it is a tributary of the Huangshui in name, the Datong River is actually the main stem of the Huangshui River system and is considerably longer than the Huangshui.
