= Elivai Mala =

Mountain in South India

Elivai Mala ഏലിവ മല
- Location within Kerala

Highest point
- Elevation: 2,088 m (6,850 ft)
- Prominence: 1,540 m (5,050 ft)
- Listing: Ultra, Ribu
- Coordinates: 10°56′N 76°38′E

Geography
- Location: Border of Mannarkad Taluk and Palakkad taluk, Palakkad district, Kerala, India
- Parent range: Western Ghats

Elivai Mala (ഏലിവ മല) is a 2,088-metre-tall (6,850 ft) peak in the Western Ghats(Sahyadri Mountains) of South India. The mountain lies in (Mannarkad taluk) Palakkad district of Kerala, close to the border with Tamil Nadu. With a topographic prominence of 1,540 metres it is one of the ultra prominent peaks of South Asia. It forms the highest point in the Western Ghats to the immediate north of the Palakkad Gap. It is the highest peak in between Anamalai Hills and Nilgiri Hills in Western Ghats.

It is situated approximately 5 kilometres to the south of Siruvani Dam and reservoir. There are a couple of waterfalls nearby including the Siruvani Waterfalls (Kovai Kutralam) and the Atla (Aaralam) Waterfalls.

== Nearby locations ==
- Siruvani Waterfalls
- Velliangiri Mountains
- Meenvallam Waterfall
- Atla (Aaralam) Waterfalls
- Kanjhirapuzha Dam
- Kanjhirapuzha Botanical Gardens
- Kanjhirapuzha Ayurveda Forest
- Siruvani Dam
- Pattiyar Bungalow
- Attapadi Reserve Forest
- Silent Valley National Park

== See also ==
- List of ultras of Tibet, East Asia and neighbouring areas
