= Miran (Xinjiang) =

Ancient city in Xinjiang

Mirān
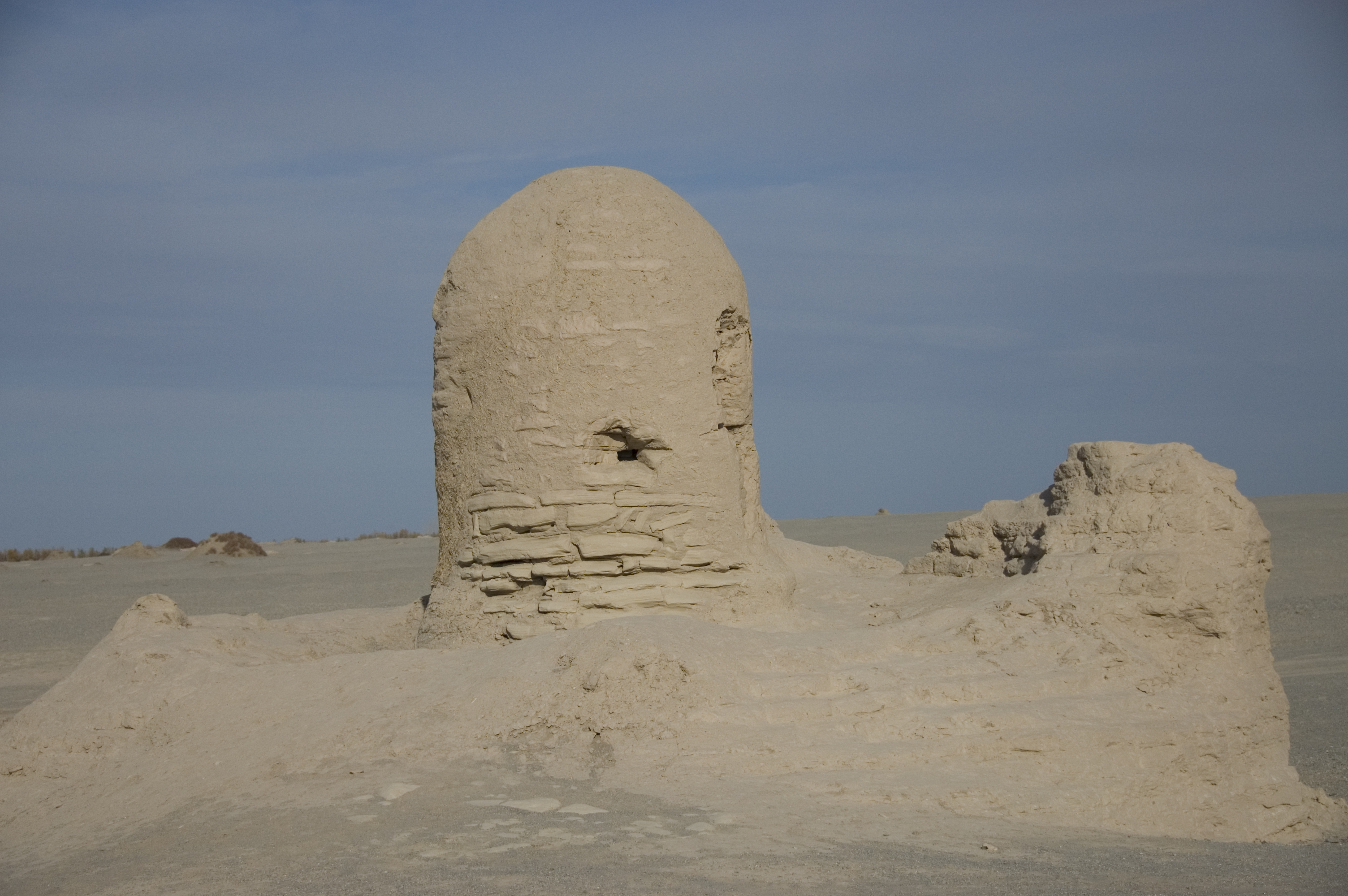
- Stupa at Mirān

- Location of Miran in China Miran (Xinjiang) (China)
- 39°14′03″N 88°56′22″E
- Location: Ruoqiang County, Xinjiang, China

Mirān (Note: simplified Chinese: 米兰; traditional Chinese: 米蘭; pinyin: Mǐlán) is a former city that existed until the 1st millennium, on the southern rim of the Taklamakan Desert in Xinjiang, China. Located at an oasis, where the Lop Nur desert meets the Altun Shan mountains, Miran was once a major point on the Silk Road.

Under the name Yuni, Miran was for a time the capital of the ancient kingdom of Kröraina, also known as Loulan, Yuni/Miran was thus part of the broader Tocharian cultures. In the early 1st millennium, it was also a thriving center of Buddhism with many monasteries and stupas. The Tibetan Empire gained control of the area during the 8th and 9th centuries, when the Miran fort was built.

As a result of desertification, Miran was later abandoned, and has since remained virtually unpopulated, isolated from other settlements and difficult to access, due to a lack of paved roads.

== Names ==
Lionel Giles has recorded the following names for Miran (with his Wade-Giles forms of the Chinese names converted to pinyin):

"Yuni, old capital of Loulan [Former Han]
"Old Eastern Town"; "Little Shanshan" [Later Han]
Qitun Cheng; Tun Cheng [Tang]
Mirān [modern name].

During the period of Tibetan occupation (mid-8th to mid-9th centuries), the area was known as Nop Chungu (or nob chu ngu).

== History ==
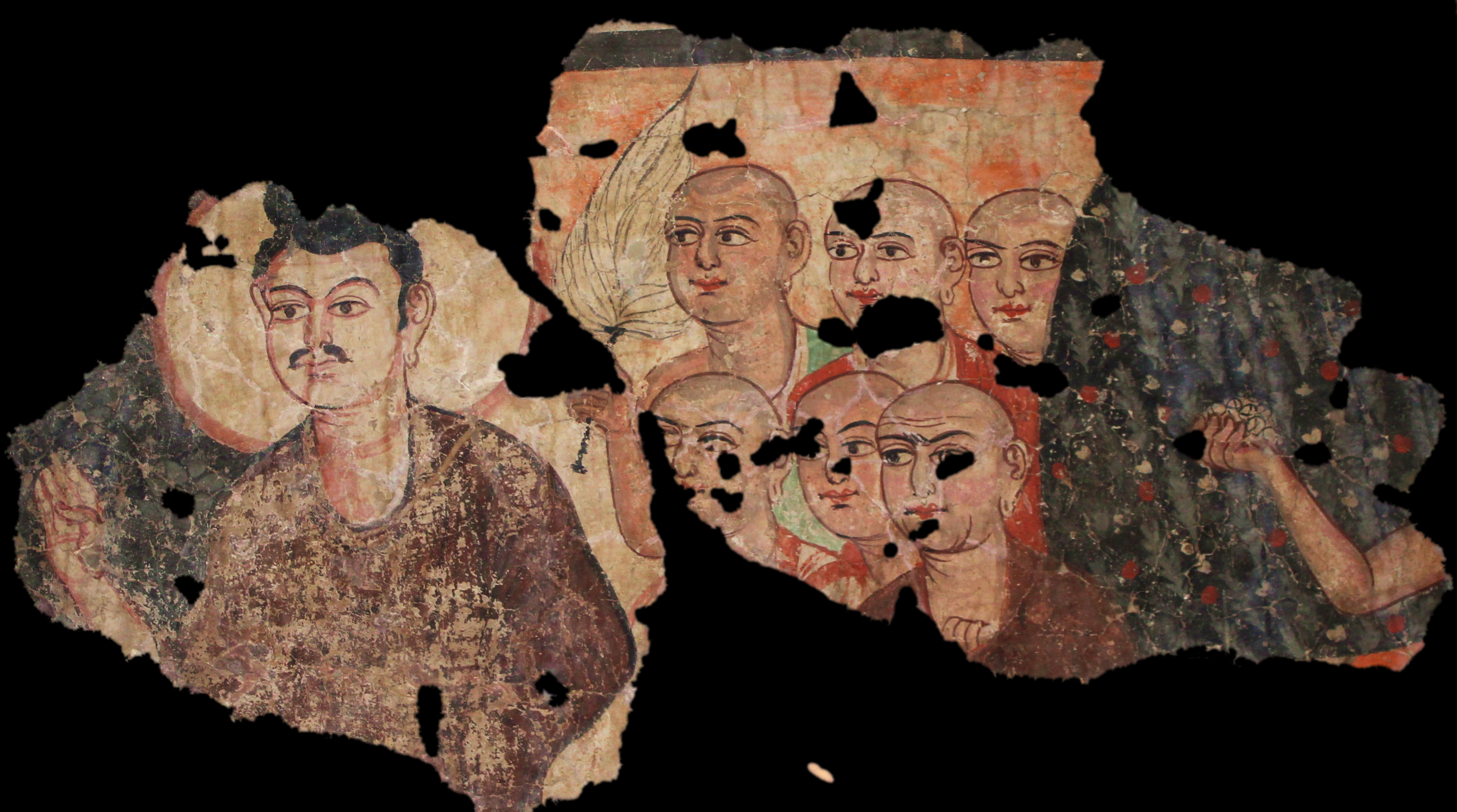
Fragment of a wall painting from a stupa in Miran depicting the Buddha (leftmost) followed by six disciples

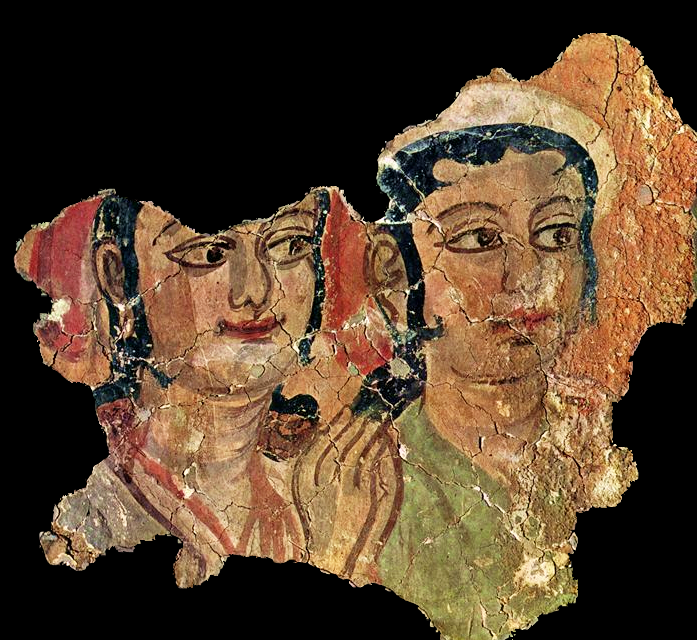
Fragment of a painting depicting two women

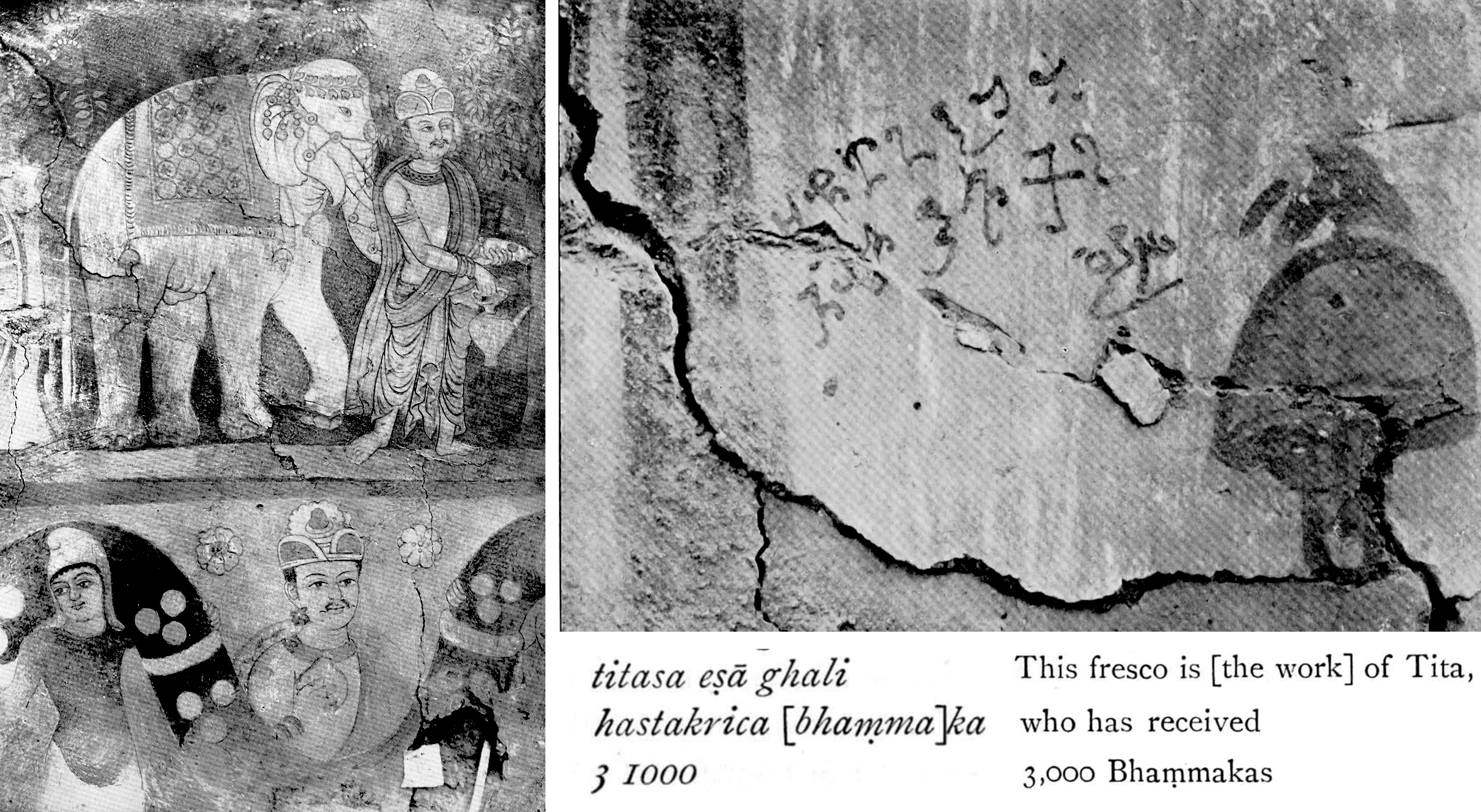
The inscription of the painter "Titus" (𐨟𐨁𐨟 Tita, top right) on the Miran V frescoe (top of the hind leg of the elephant)

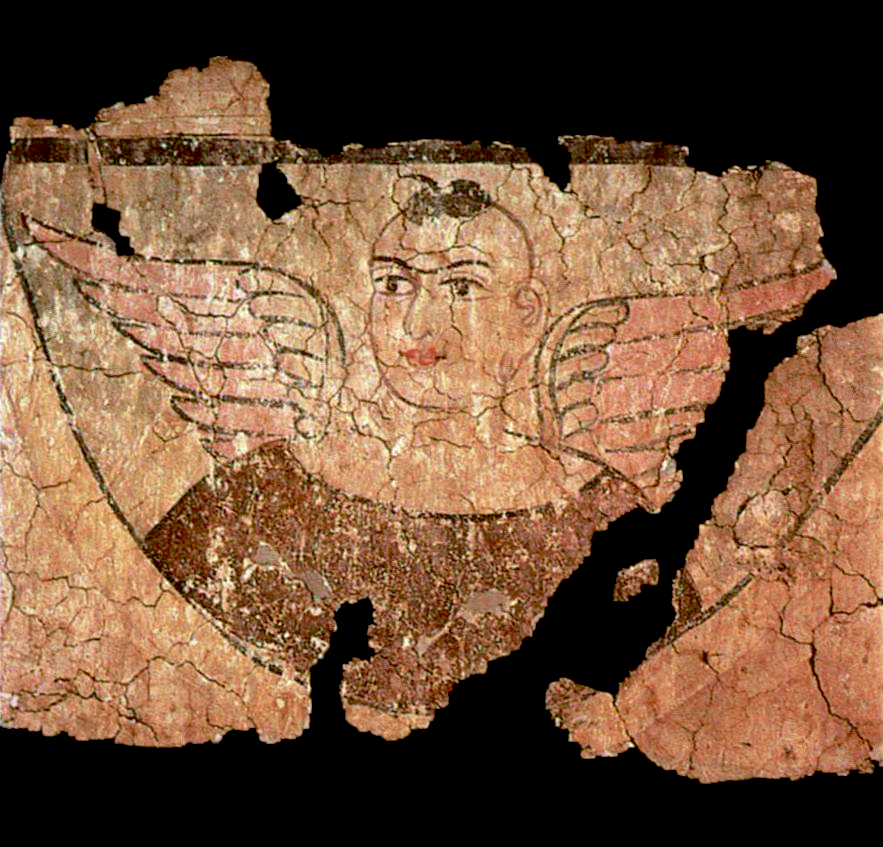
Fresco fragment from stupa shrine M III, Miran

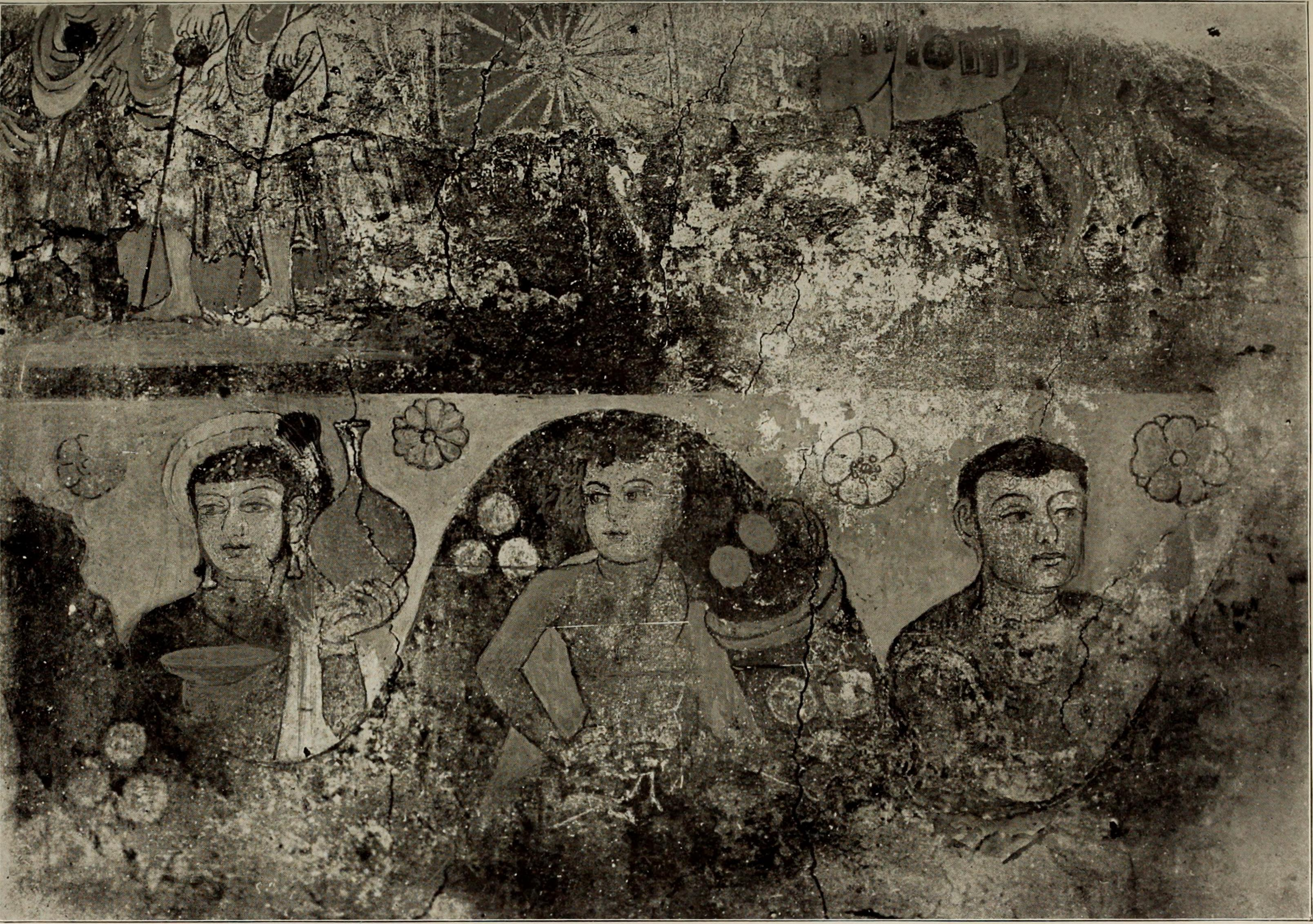
Garland bearers on a frescoe at Miran

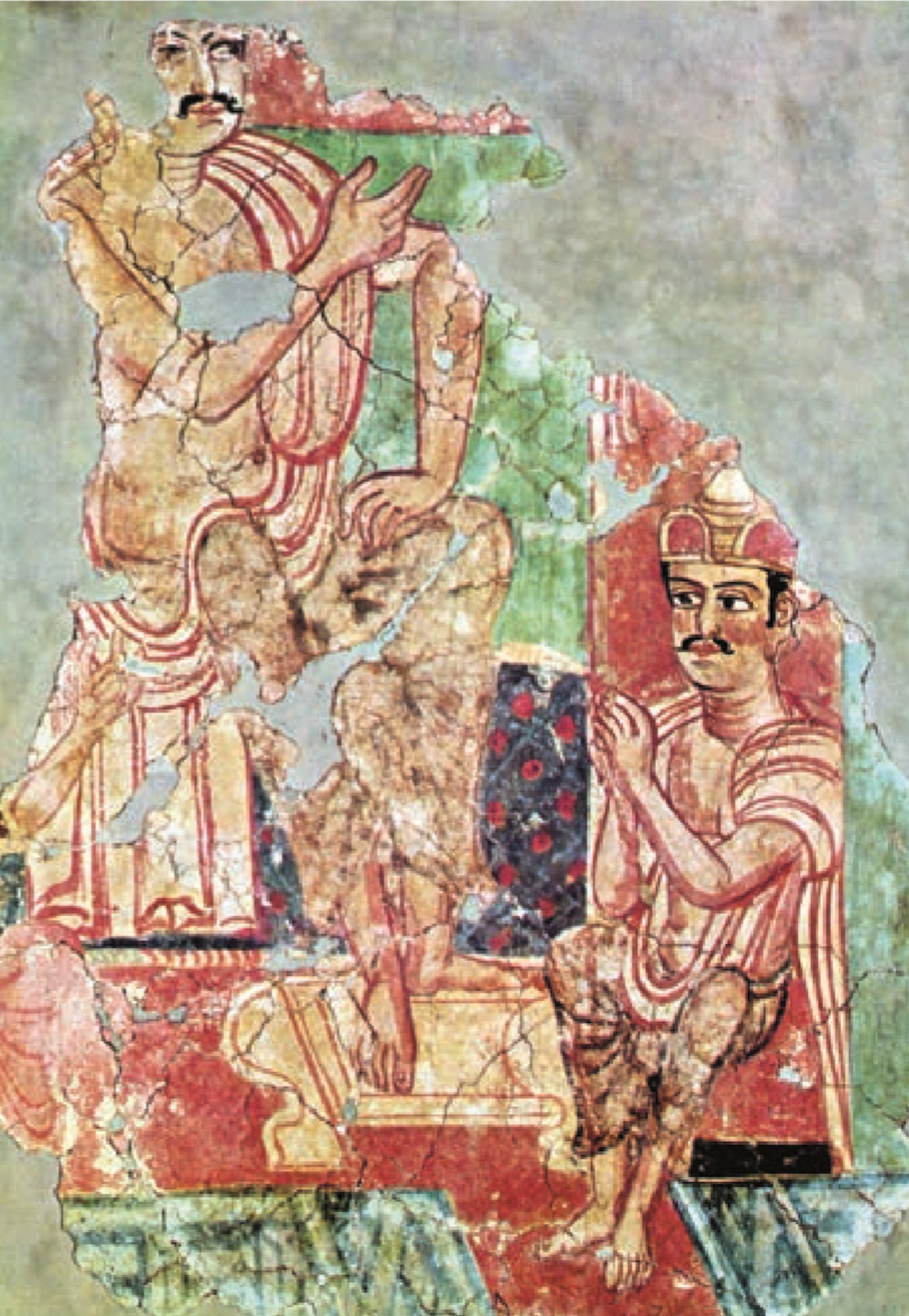
Miran Stupa shrine MIII fragment

In ancient times, Miran was a busy trading centre on the southern part of the Silk Road, after the route split into two (the northern route and the southern route), as caravans of merchants sought to escape travel across the harsh wasteland of the desert (called by the Chinese "The Sea of Death") and the Tarim Basin. The routes went around its north or south rim.

During the 1st millennium CE, a river flowed into the area from a nearby mountain range, and Miran had a sophisticated irrigation system. As a result of the river drying-up, the region experienced desertification and Miran was gradually abandoned.

Archaeological excavations (undertaken since the early 20th century) have revealed an extensive Buddhist monastery complex, which existed between the 2nd to 5th centuries. Buddhist devotees would have walked around the covered circular stupas, whose central pillar contained relics of the Buddha.

Miran was one of the smaller cities in Kröraina (also known as Loulan), which was brought under the control of the Chinese Han dynasty in the 3rd century. After the 4th century, Chinese records suggest it began to decline as a trading center.

In the mid-8th century, Miran became a fort town because of its location at the mouth of a pass on one of the routes into Tibet. This is where the Tibetan forces crossed when the Chinese army withdrew to deal with rebels in central China. The Tibetans remained there, using the old irrigation system, until the Tibetan Empire lost its territories in Central Asia around the middle of the ninth century.

== Archaeology ==
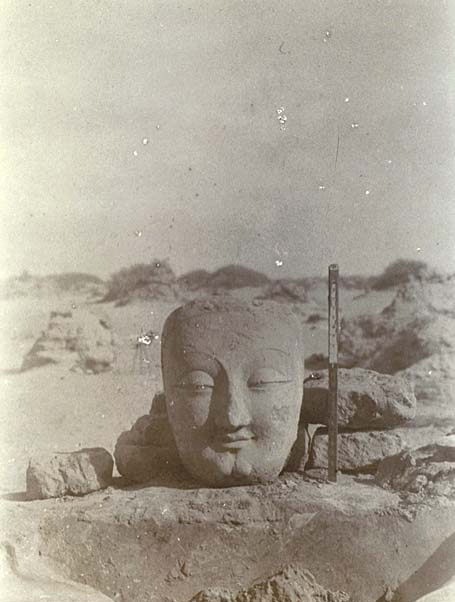
View of excavated Buddha head in Miran, December 1906.

The ruins at Miran consist of a large rectangular fort, a monastery ('the Vihara' in Stein's accounts), several stupas and many sun-dried brick constructions, located relatively close to the ancient caravan track to Dunhuang, running west to east. The many artifacts found in Miran demonstrate the extensive and sophisticated trade connections these ancient towns had with places as far away as the Mediterranean Sea. Archaeological evidence from Miran shows the influence of Buddhism on artistic work as early as the first century BC. Early Buddhist sculptures and murals excavated from the site demonstrate a Serindian style similar to the traditions of western Central Asia and the Gandhara art of the northwest Indian subcontinent; other artistic aspects of the paintings found there suggest that Miran had a direct connection with Rome and its provinces.

This Romanesque style is thought to be the work of a Buddhist painter known as "Titus" (𐨟𐨁𐨟, Tita), who signed his painting at Miran with his name in Indian Kharoshti characters, and who was perhaps a Roman artist who traveled east along the Silk Roads in search of employment. Several artefacts have been found at the Miran site, including bows and arrows.

== Expeditions and visitors to the site ==
- 1876: The first person to mention the ancient site was Nikolay Przhevalsky. After his second expedition to the region, he wrote about a very large ruined city near the Lopnor lake, which, judging from its geographical position on his map, must have been Miran.
- 1905: Ellsworth Huntington, an American geologist, the first to examine Miran, identified the fort, the monastery, and two stupas during a short visit, and recognized the Buddhist character of the site.
- 1906-1907: Aurel Stein visited and excavated Miran fort and surrounding sites during his second expedition to Central Asia, carrying out a thorough excavation of the fort, uncovering 44 rooms (site numbers M.I.i - M.I.xliv). He excavated other sites in the area, mainly to the north and west of the fort (site numbers M.II - M.X), including several temples containing well-preserved Buddhist fresco and stucco images.
- 1902 and 1910: Count Ōtani Kōzui sent missions from Kyoto to some Taklamakan sites, among them Miran, to bring back Buddhist texts, wall paintings and sculptures.
- 1914: Aurel Stein returned to Miran on his third expedition, excavating other sites in the area (site numbers M.XI - M.XV), which were ruins of stupas and towers. The objects found in these included more stucco images and wooden carved objects.
- 1957-8: Professor Huang Wenbi lead a team from the Institute of Archaeology, CASS, spending six days at Miran, and a report was published in 1983 describing the fort and two stupa/temple sites, and a number of finds.
- 1959: A team from Xinjiang Museum spent ten days in Miran examining the fort, temple site and dwelling areas. A report of their considerable findings was published in 1960.
- 1965: Rao Reifu, an engineer, investigated the remains of a substantial irrigation system in the Miran area and published his findings in 1982.
- 1973: Another team from the Xinjiang Museum visited the site an investigated the fort, temples and irrigation system. The excavations and the artefacts found in these sites were discussed in an expedition report by Mu Shunying in 1983.
- 1978-80: The most extensive investigation of the site so far was carried out by Huang Xiaojing and Zhang Ping of the Xinjiang Museum. Their 1985 report discusses the fort, 8 stupas, 3 temple sites, 2 beacons, dwellings, tombs, a kiln area and a smelting site.
- 1988: The archaeological team of XJASS visited the site and published a report, containing little new information.
- 1989: Professor Wang Binghua visited several of the temple sites.
- 1989: Christa Paula visited Miran, and published a description with photographs.
- 1996: Peter Yung visited Miran recording his experiences in words and photographs.

== Transportation ==
- Milan railway station (Xinjiang)

== See also ==
- Shanshan
- Lop Nur
- Xiaohe Tomb complex
- Niya
- Loulan Kingdom
- Charklik
