= Milan railway station (Xinjiang) =

Railway station in Xinjiang, China

Coordinates: 39.1403°N 88.8791°E

Milan railway station (Chinese: 米兰站) is a railway station located in Ruoqiang County, in the southern part of Xinjiang Uyghur Autonomous Region, China. It is also called Miran railway station because it is located near the Miran Ruins, and is one station east of Charkulik railway station (若羌站) on the Golmud–Korla railway (from Golmud, Qinghai to Korla, Xinjiang) in the direction of Golmud.

Milan railway station officially began to be used in December, 2020, with the opening of the Golmud–Korla railway. Moreover, the construction of the branch line from Milan station via the dried-up Lop Nor to Hami railway station in eastern Xinjiang Uyghur Autonomous Region, started in 2023, with the target completion in three years.

== Transport ==
- Ruoqiang Loulan Airport

== See also ==
- Railways in Xinjiang Uyghur Autonomous Region
