= Loulan =

Ancient kingdom in Xinjiang, China

- 樓蘭 (Chinese); 𐨐𐨿𐨪𐨆𐨪𐨩𐨁𐨣 (Gāndhārī); كروران (Uyghur)
- Kroraina, Kroran
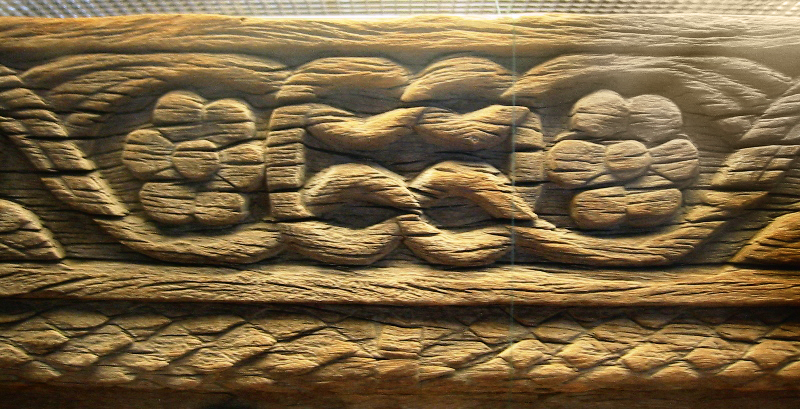
- A carved wooden beam from Loulan in the British Museum, 3rd–4th century. The patterns show influences from ancient western civilizations.

- Location within Xinjiang Location within China
- 40°31′39.48″N 89°50′26.32″E
- Type: Settlement
- Location: Xinjiang, China

Site notes
- Condition: In ruins

Loulan

Chinese name
- Traditional Chinese: 樓蘭
- Simplified Chinese: 楼兰
Transcriptions
Standard Mandarin
- Hanyu Pinyin: Lóulán
- Wade–Giles: Lou^{2}-lan^{2}

Uyghur name
- Uyghur: كروران
Transcriptions
- Latin Yëziqi: Kroran
- Yengi Yeziⱪ: Kroran
- SASM/GNC: Kroran
- Siril Yëziqi: Кроран

Gāndhārī name
- Gāndhārī: 𐨐𐨿𐨪𐨆𐨪𐨩𐨁𐨣

Loulan, (Note: Chinese: 樓蘭; pinyin: Lóulán; Eastern Han Chinese lo-lɑn; Old Chinese rô-rân) also known by its indigenous name Kroraina (Note: Gāndhārī: 𐨐𐨿𐨪𐨆𐨪𐨩𐨁𐨣, romanized: Krorayina) or Kroran, (Note: Uyghur: كروران) was an ancient Tocharian kingdom in the Tarim Basin, today consumed by the Lop Desert. Based around what was at the time an important oasis city along the Silk Road, Loulan was already known as far back as the 2nd century BCE. At the time, it was said to be on the northeastern edge of the Lop Desert. The capital of the kingdom sat alongside aside the lake Lop Nur, which today has dried entirely into desert.

The kingdom was renamed Shanshan (鄯善) after its king was assassinated by an envoy of the Han dynasty in 77 BCE; however, the town at the northwestern corner of Lop Nur retained the name of Loulan. The kingdom included at various times settlements such as Niya, Charklik, Miran and Qiemo. It was intermittently under Chinese control from the early Han dynasty onward until its abandonment centuries later. The ruins of Loulan are near the now-desiccated Lop Nur in the Bayingolin Mongol Autonomous Prefecture, Xinjiang and they are now completely surrounded by desert.

== History ==
Loulan and contemporary polities c. 100 BCE

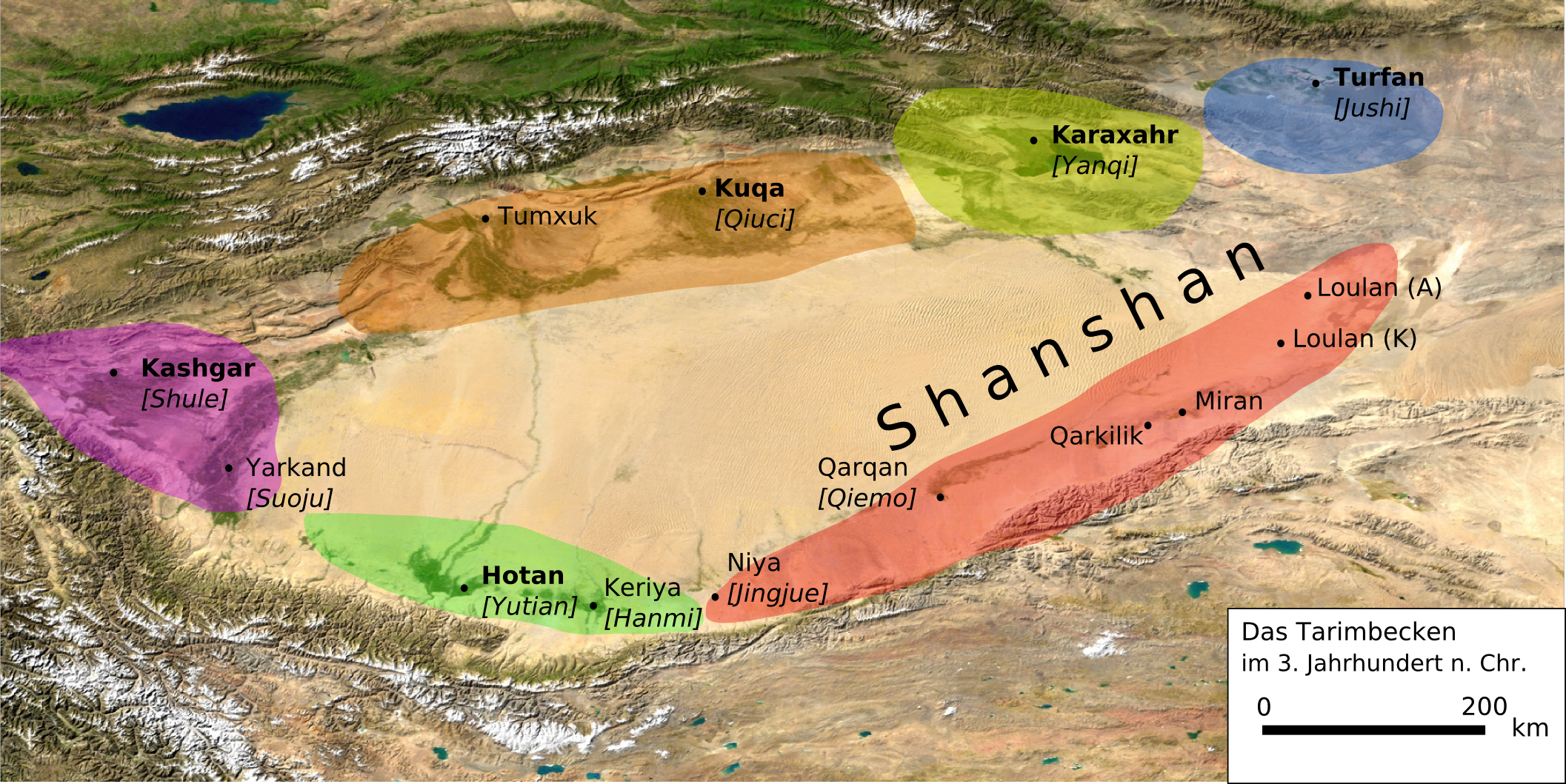
The Tarim Basin in the 3rd century CE, showing two sites of the town of Loulan, the Shanshan kingdom, and the related states

=== Pre-Han Kingdom ===
By the 2nd century BC, Loulan had grown to dominate the region around the Tarim Basin. Archeological evidence suggests a sophisticated culture with major importance in the trade between central Asia and India. Southern merchants passed through mountain ranges such as the Karakoram, Himalayas and Hindu Kush as far north as the Taklamakan desert, to important trading cities like Loulan and its commercial rival Niya. This is evidenced by graffiti carved on stones along the route in Indic scripts such as Kharosti and Brahmi, while there are depictions of Siddhartha Gautama (evidencing the spread of Buddhism along the trade route). From here, Loulan was on the main route from Dunhuang to Korla, where it joined the so-called "northern route," and was also connected by a route southwest to the kingdom's seat of government in the town of Wuni in the Charkhlik/Ruoqiang oasis, and from thence to Khotan and Yarkand.

A number of mummies, now known as the Tarim mummies, have been found in Loulan and in its surrounding areas. One female mummy has been dated to c. 1800 BCE (3,800-year-old), indicating very early settlement of the region. The disinterred corpses were not Chinese or Indian but had fair hair and light skin, some over six feet in length; this has led to suggestions that those from the Shanshan kingdoms were descendants of migrants from the Eurasian Steppe. Genetic analysis of the mummies, however, suggests that the Early–Middle Bronze Age population may have arisen from an ancient genetically isolated local population but were possibly influenced by the pastoralist and agriculturalist practices of their neighbours. The mummies were wrapped in cotton and silk, the former from the west and latter from the east, further providing evidence as to Loulan's commercial importance.

=== Early Han dynasty ===
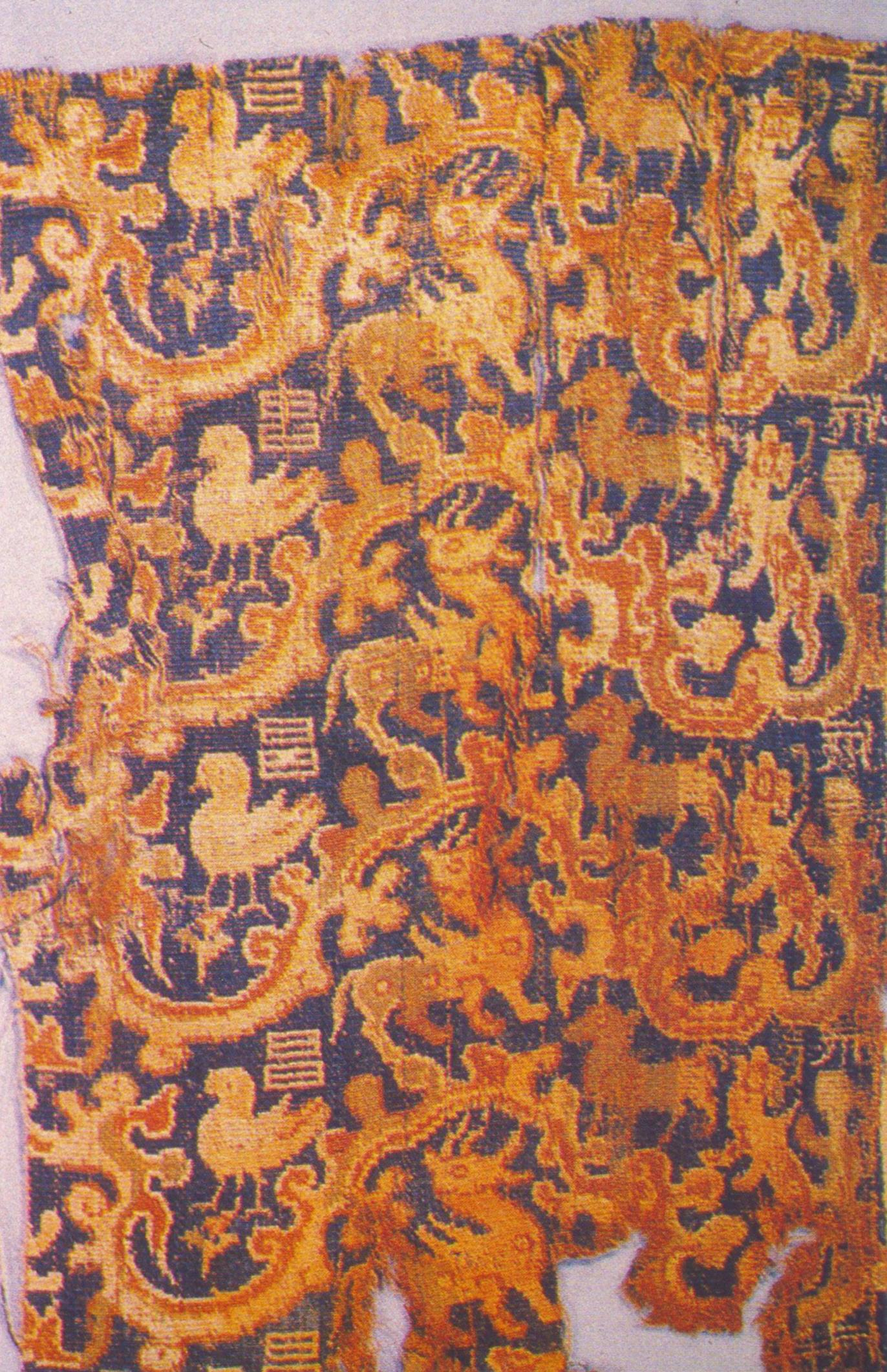
Sichuan brocade fragment uncovered in Loulan

The interactions between Loulan and the Han court (206 BCE – 220 CE) were described in some detail in the Book of Han (completed in 111 CE).

The first contemporaneous mention of Loulan, in Chinese records, is from 126 BCE. A letter from the Chanyu of the Xiongnu to the Chinese emperor, in which the Chanyu boasted of conquering Loulan, as well as the Yuezhi, Wusun, Hujie (呼揭) and another "26 states nearby". In the same year, the Chinese envoy Zhang Qian described Loulan as a fortified city near the great salt lake or marsh known as Lop Nur.

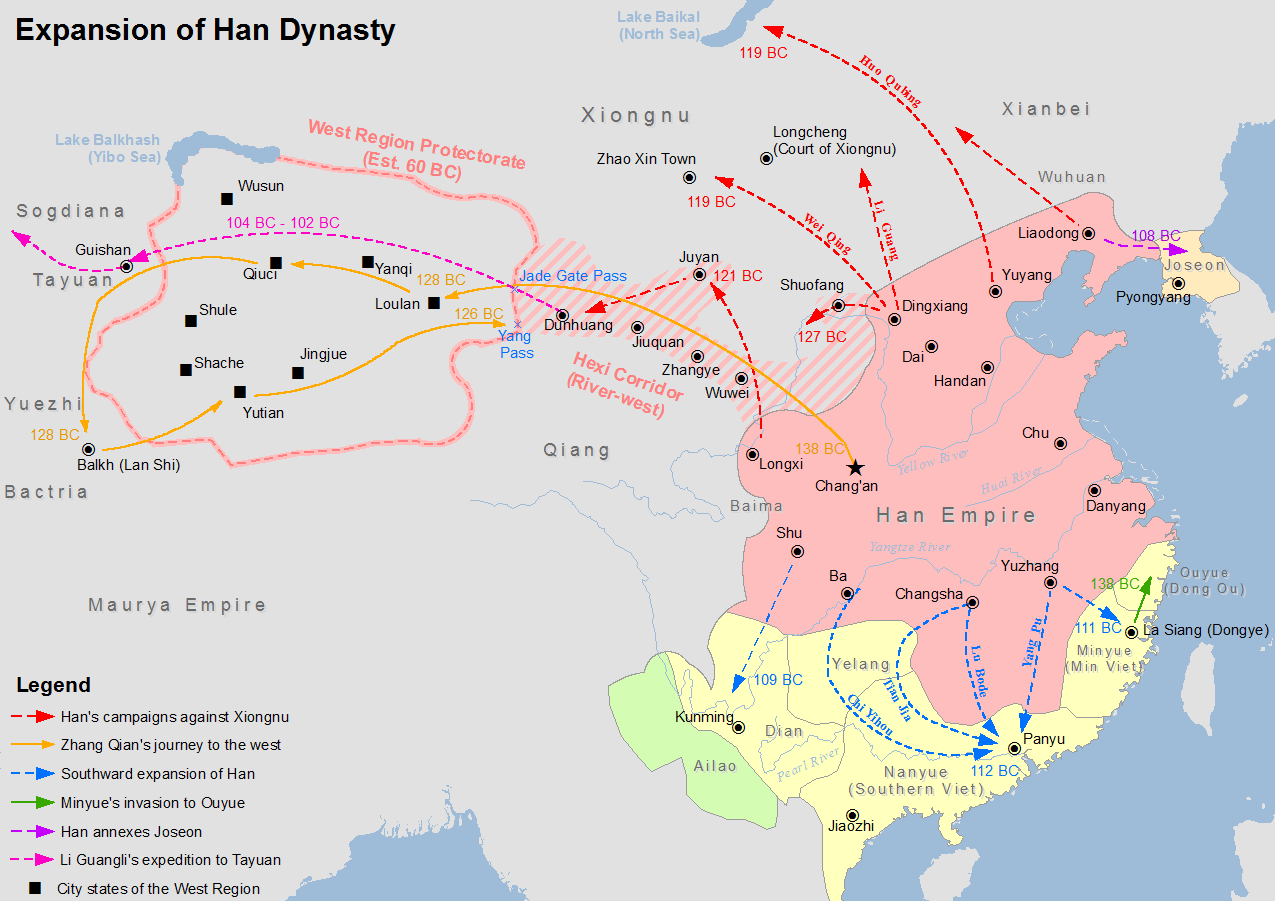
Loulan and several other Indo-European oases kingdoms as Western Region Protectorate of the Han.

During the late 2nd century BCE, Emperor Wu of Han (r. 141 BCE – 87 BCE) was interested in extending contact with Dayuan (Fergana), following the reports of it by the Chinese envoy, Zhang Qian. However, according to Chinese sources, Han envoys to Fergana were harassed by Loulan and the kingdom of Gushi (or Jushi). Consequently, in 108 BCE, Loulan was attacked by a Han force led by Zhao Ponu (趙破奴) and its king captured, after which Loulan agreed to pay a tribute to Han China. The Xiongnu, on hearing of these events, also attacked Loulan. The king of Loulan therefore elected to send one of his sons as a hostage to the Xiongnu and another to the Han court. Due to Loulan's association with the Xiongnu, the Book of Han records:

The Emperor commanded [Jen] Wen to lead the troops by a suitable route, to arrest the king of Lou-lan and to bring him to the palace at the capital city. [Jen Wen] interrogated by presenting him with a bill of indictment, which he answered by claiming that [Lou-lan] was a small state lying between large states, and that unless it subjected itself to both parties, there would be no means of keeping itself in safety; he therefore wished to remove his kingdom and take up residence within the Han territory.

— Hanshu, chapter 96a, translation from Hulsewé 1979.

The Han emperor was satisfied with the statement and released the king, but retained his son as hostage. When this particular king of Loulan died, in 92 BCE, his court requested that the Han court release the king's son and heir be returned to Loulan. In the meantime, however, this prince from Loulan had been castrated for infringing Han law, without the knowledge of Loulan. The Han court replied that its Emperor had grown too fond of the prince to release him, and that another son should be enthroned in Loulan. The son of the new king was also sent to the Han court as a hostage, yet another was sent to the Xiongnu. After the death of this king of Loulan, the Xiongnu returned the hostage sent previously by Loulan – a prince named Chang Gui or An Gui (嘗歸 or 安歸), who became king of Loulan. When the Han court heard of this, it demanded that the new king present himself to the Han court. Chang Gui refused, on his wife's advice – because the Han court had previously failed to return hostages.

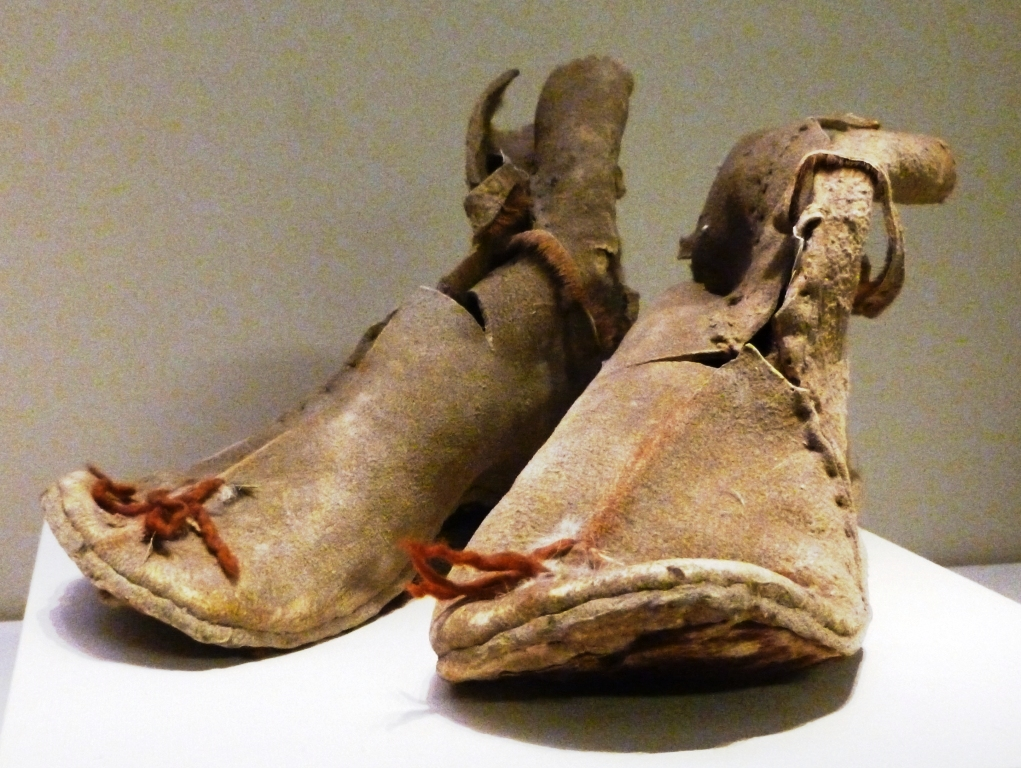
Oxhide boots from Loulan. Former Han dynasty 220 BCE-8 CE.

In 77 BCE, after several Han envoys had been intercepted and killed in or near Loulan, a Chinese delegation was sent with orders to assassinate the king of Loulan. One of the envoys, Fu Jiezi, gained entry to Loulan by claiming to carry silk and valuables as gifts for the king. Having received Fu Jiezi's gifts, the king got drunk, after which Fu Jiezi's guard stabbed him to death, severed his head and had it hung from a tower above the northern gate. Upon completing the assassination, the guard supposedly proclaimed: "The Son of Heaven (Han Emperor Zhao) has sent me to punish the king, by reason of his crime in turning against the Han...Han troops are about the arrive here; do not dare to make any move which would result in yourselves bringing about the destruction of your state." While the king's younger brother Weituqi (尉屠耆) succeeded him as king, the Han court apparently tightened its grip on Loulan from this point – a step symbolized by the Han court obliging Loulan to adopt a new official name, the non-native exonym Shanshan.

Because of its strategic position on what became the main route from China to the West, during the Han dynasty, control of it was regularly contested between the Chinese and the Xiongnu until well into the 2nd century CE.

=== Shanshan ===
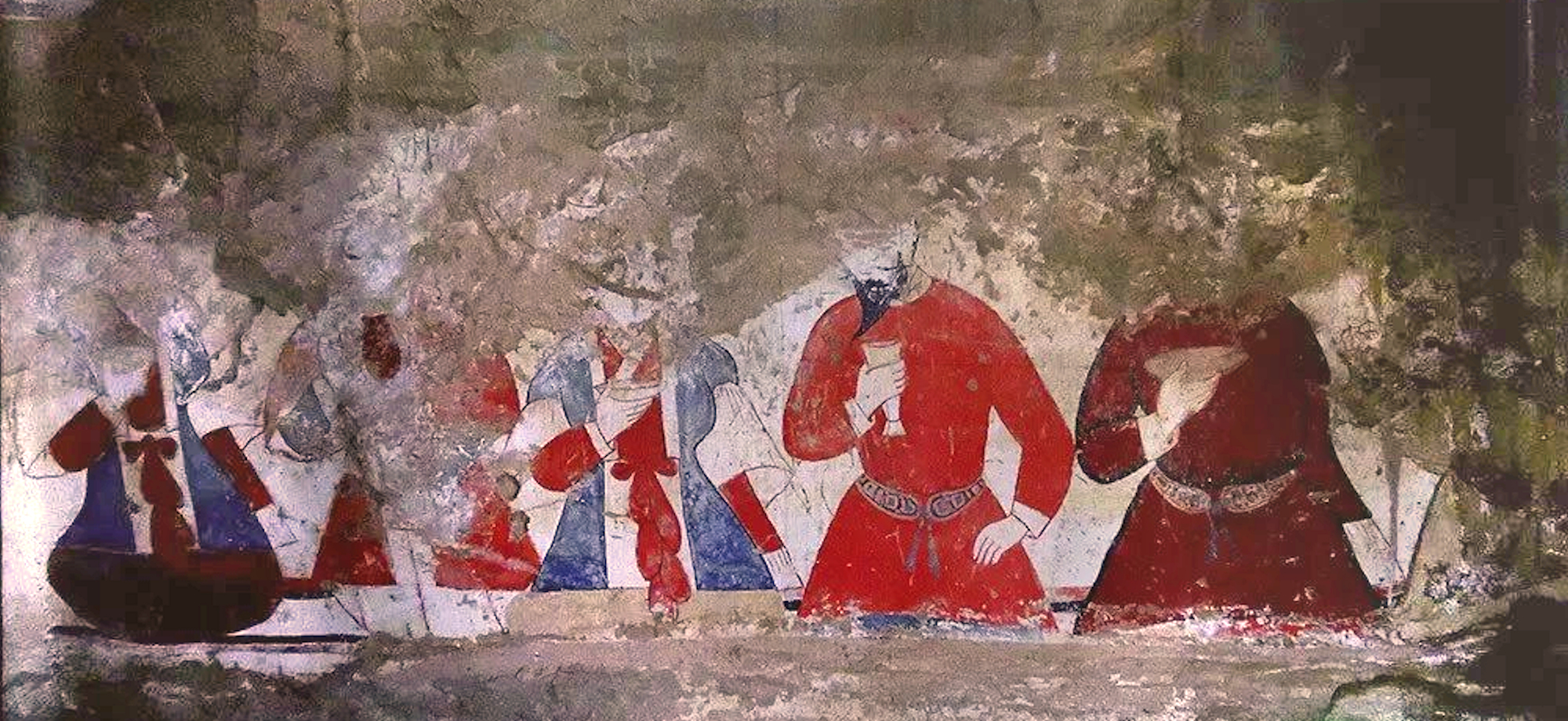
Loulan tomb mural, 220–420 CE. Loulan Museum

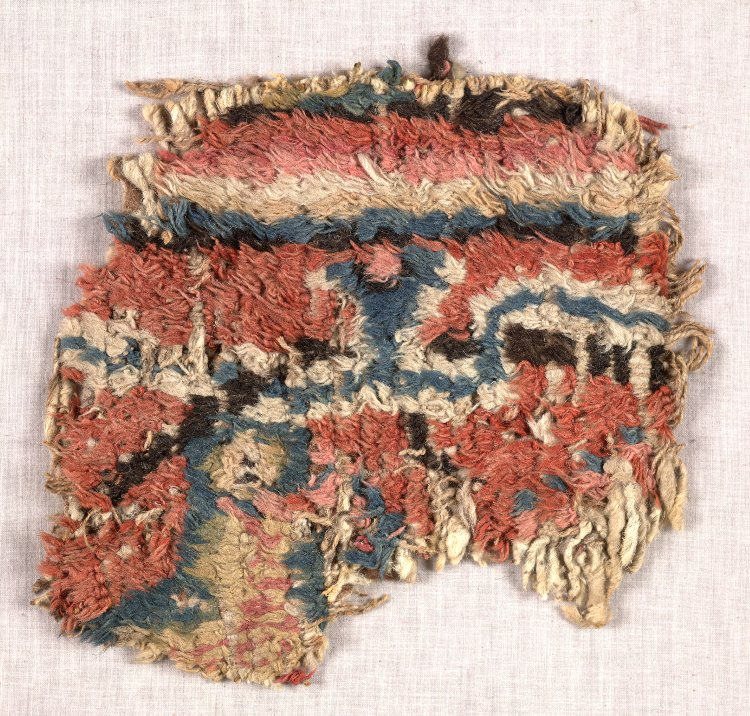
Fragment of carpet discovered by Aurel Stein in a refuse pit at Loulan. 3rd–4th century.

After the Han dynasty had gained control of Loulan, the renamed kingdom of Shanshan became a Chinese puppet state. The newly installed king, fearing retribution from the sons of the assassinated king, requested that a contingent of Han forces be established in Yixun (伊循, variously identified as Charklik or Miran). Chinese army officers were sent to colonize the area, and an office of commandant was established at Yixun. A number of settlements in the Tarim Basin such as Qiemo and Niya were described in the Book of Han as independent states, but these later became part of Shanshan. While the name of the kingdom was changed to Shanshan by the Chinese, the Loulan region continued to be known as Kroran by the locals.

The region remained under Chinese control intermittently, and when China was weak in the Western Regions, Loulan was essentially independent. In 25 CE it was recorded that Loulan was in league with the Xiongnu. In 73 CE, the Han army officer Ban Chao went with a small group of followers to Shanshan, which was also receiving a delegation from the Xiongnu at the same time. Ban Chao killed the Xiongnu envoys and presented their heads to the King, after which King Guang of Shanshan submitted to Han authority. This would ensure the first step of the 'Silk Road' from central China to Shanshan would be under stable Chinese control. Around 119, Ban Yong recommended that a Chinese colony of 500 men be established in Loulan. A later military colony was established at Loulan by General Suo Man. It was recorded that in 222 CE, Shanshan sent tribute to China, and that in 283, the son of the king was sent as a hostage to the Chinese court during the reign of Emperor Wu of Jin. Loulan was also recorded as a dependent kingdom of Shanshan in the 3rd century Book of Wei.

The town of Loulan was abandoned in 330 CE, probably owing to lack of water when the Tarim River, which supported the settlement, changed course; the military garrison was moved 50 kilometres (31 mi) south to Haitou (海頭). The fort of Yingpan to the northwest remained under Chinese control until the Tang dynasty. According to the Book of Wei, King Bilong of Shanshan fled to Qiemo together with half of his countrymen after an attack by Juqu Anzhou in 442 CE; so, Shanshan came to be ruled by Qiemo. In 445 Shanshan submitted to the Northern Wei. At the end of the 6th century, the Sui dynasty reestablished the city state of Shanshan.

After the 5th century, however, the land was frequently invaded by nomadic states such as Tuyuhun, the Rouran Khaganate, and the Dingling and the area gradually was abandoned. Around 630, at the beginning of the Tang period, Shanfutuo (鄯伏陁) led the remaining Shanshan people to Hami.

The Buddhist pilgrim Xuanzang passed through this region in 644 on his return from India to China, visited a town called Nafubo (納縛波, thought to be Charklik) of Loulan, and wrote of Qiemo, "A fortress exists, but not a trace of man".

== Descriptions in historical accounts ==
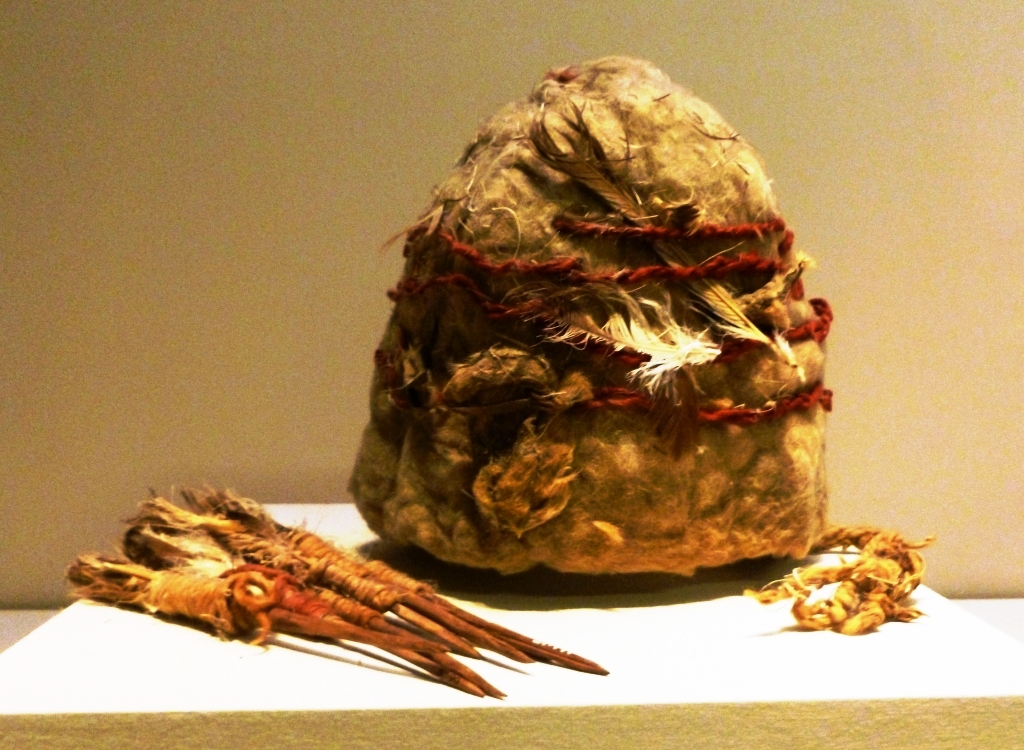
Felt and feather hat from Loulan. Early Han dynasty 202 BCE–8 CE

According to the Book of Han, Han envoys described the troops of Loulan as weak and easy to attack. Shanshan was said to have 1,570 households and 14,000 individuals, with 2,912 persons able to bear arms. It further described the region thus:

The land is sandy and salt, and there are few cultivated fields. The state hopes to obtain [the produce of] cultivated fields and look to neighbouring states for field-crops. It produces jade and there is an abundance of rushes, tamarisk, the balsam poplar, and white grass. In company with their flocks and herds the inhabitants go in search of water and pasture, and there are asses, horses and large number of camels. [The inhabitants] are capable of making military weapons in the same way as the Ch'o of the Ch'iang tribes.

According to the Commentary on the Water Classic, General Suo Mai (索勱, also Suo Man) of Dunhuang introduced irrigation techniques to the region by damming the Zhubin (possibly the Kaidu River) to irrigate the fields and produced bumper harvests for the next three years.

The Buddhist pilgrim Faxian who stayed in Shanshan in 399 on the way to India, described the country:

[A] country rugged and hilly, with a thin and barren soil. The clothes of the common people are coarse, and like those worn in our land of Han, some wearing felt and others coarse serge or cloth of hair; — this was the only difference seen among them. The king professed (our) Law, and there might be in the country more than four thousand monks who were all students of the hînayâna. The common people of this and other kingdoms (in that region), as well as the śramans, all practise the rules of India, only that the latter do so more exactly, and the former more loosely.

— A Record of the Buddhist Countries, translation by James Legge

The famous historical short story by acclaimed Japanese author Yasushi Inoue entitled "Lou-lan" recounts the continual flux of control in the area and how the inhabitants dealt with Chinese & nomadic invaders throughout its relatively short history.

== Ethnolinguistic identity ==
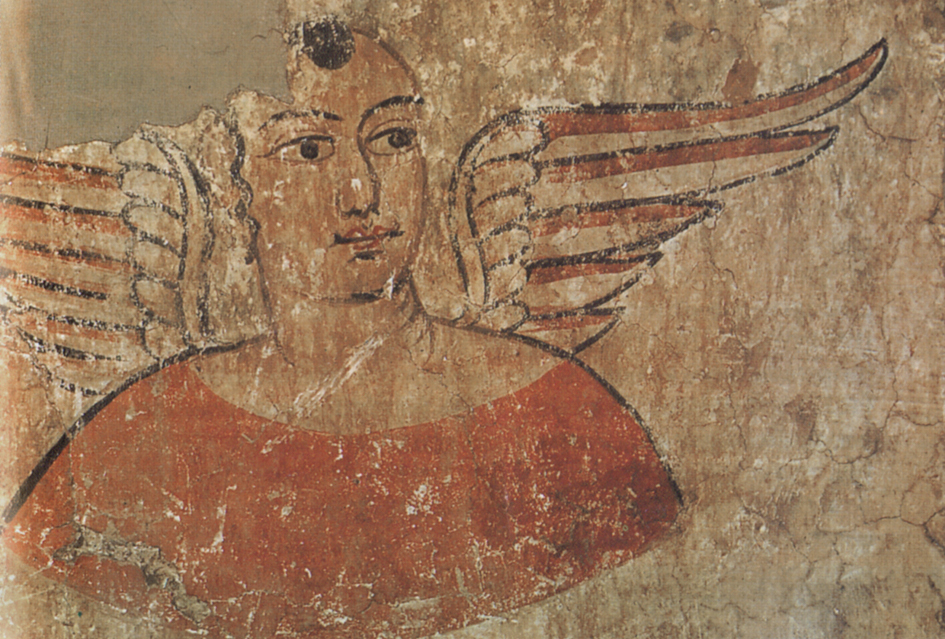
Winged male figure, with Hellenistic influences, from the mural paintings signed Tita in the Loulan site of Miran (Xinjiang), 3rd century CE

The earliest known residents in Loulan are thought to have been a subgroup of the Tocharians, an Indo-European people of the Tarim Basin. Excavations in Loulan and the surrounding areas have found mummies believed to be remains of these people, for example the so-called "Beauty of Loulan" which was found by Chinese archaeologists in 1979–1980 at Qäwrighul (Gumugou), around 70 km (43 mi) west-north-west of Loulan. The mummies have been dated to as early as 1800 BCE. Genetic and proteomic analyses of the mummies, however, suggests that the local population were genetically isolated but were influenced by practices of neighbouring populations.

The official language found in 3rd century CE documents in this region is Gandhari Prakrit written in Kharosthi script; their use in Loulan and elsewhere in the Tarim Basin was most likely due to the cultural legacy of the Kushan Empire, and introduced by Gandharan migrants from the Kushan Empire. These Gandharan migrants are also believed to have introduced Buddhism to Loulan. Although Gandhari was used as the administrative language, some words generally thought to be of Tocharian origin are found in the documents, suggesting that the locals spoke a language that belongs to the Tocharian group of languages. This original language of Loulan is referred to as Krorainic or "Tocharian C", due to its relatedness to the two other Tocharian languages. It has been partially reconstructed from around 100 loanwords and over a thousand proper names used in these Prakrit documents that cannot be ascribed to Indic. In 2018, documents from Loulan written in Tocharian C were published, indicating a relationship to Tocharian A and B, but transcription of the texts in this study has been rejected by other scholars.

The native name of Loulan was "Kroran" or "Kroraina", written in Chinese as Loulan 樓蘭 (*glu-glân in reconstructed Han dynasty pronunciation, an approximation of Kroran). Centuries later in 664 CE the Tang Chinese Buddhist monk Xuanzang mentioned a place in Loulan named "Nafupo" (納縛溥), which according to Dr. Hisao Matsuda is a transliteration of the Sogdian word Navapa meaning "new water." Sogdians, an Eastern Iranian people, maintained minority communities in various places in China at the time, especially Dunhuang in Gansu and Turfan in the Tarim Basin. Documents found in Loulan showed that Sogdians were present in the area in 313 CE, as well as Han Chinese and Tibetan tribesmen, indicating an ethnically diverse population in Loulan.

== Archaeology ==
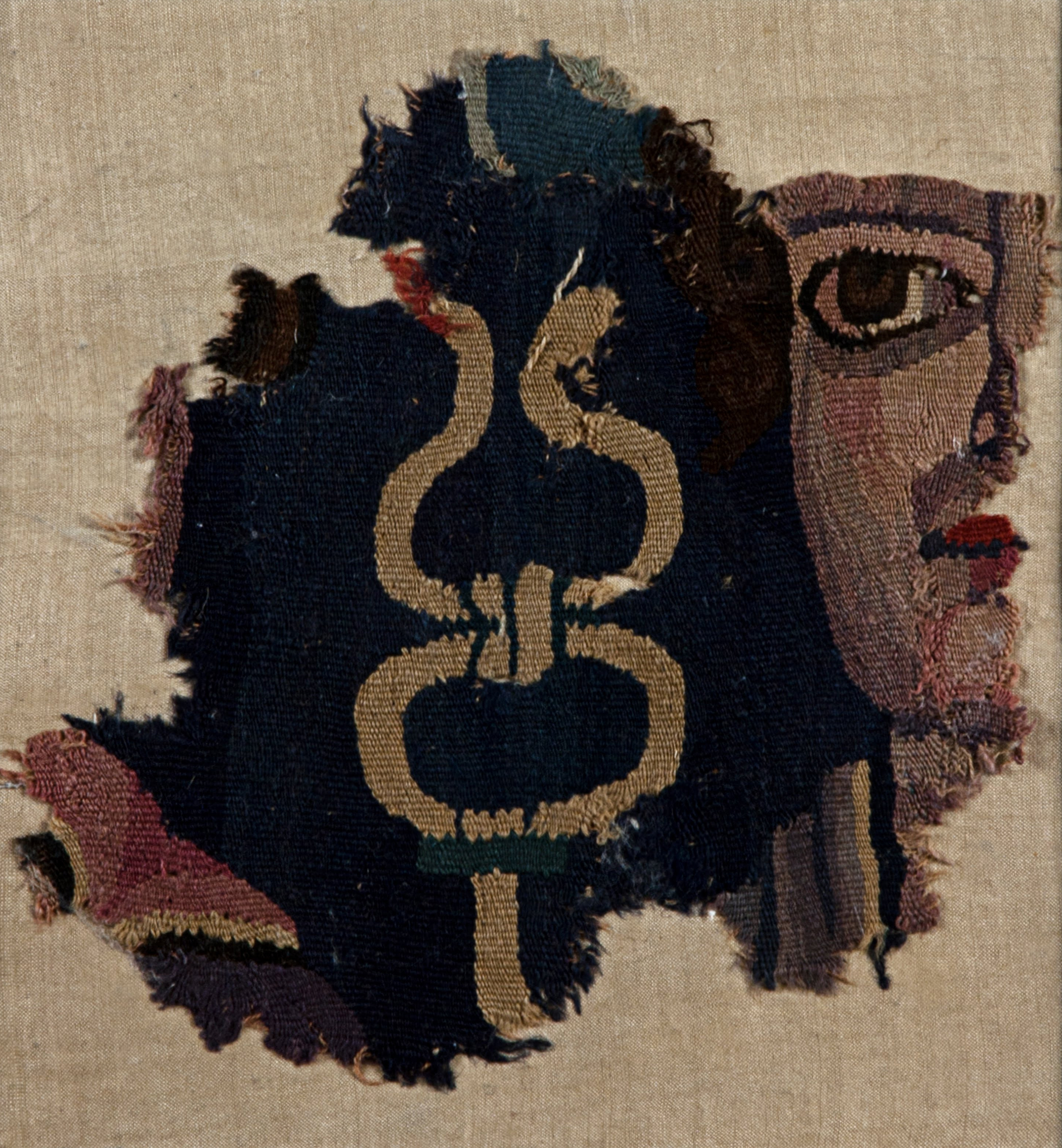
Male face with a caduceus 200–400 AD. The staff suggests the Greek deity Hermes.

=== Sven Hedin ===
The ruined city of Loulan was discovered by Sven Hedin, who excavated some houses and found a wooden Kharosthi tablet and many Chinese manuscripts from the Western Jin dynasty (266–420), which recorded that the area was called "Kroran" by the locals in Kharosthi but was rendered as "Lou-lan" in Chinese. Hedin also proposed that a change in the course of the Tarim river resulted in Lop Nur drying up may be the reason why Loulan had perished.

=== Aurel Stein ===
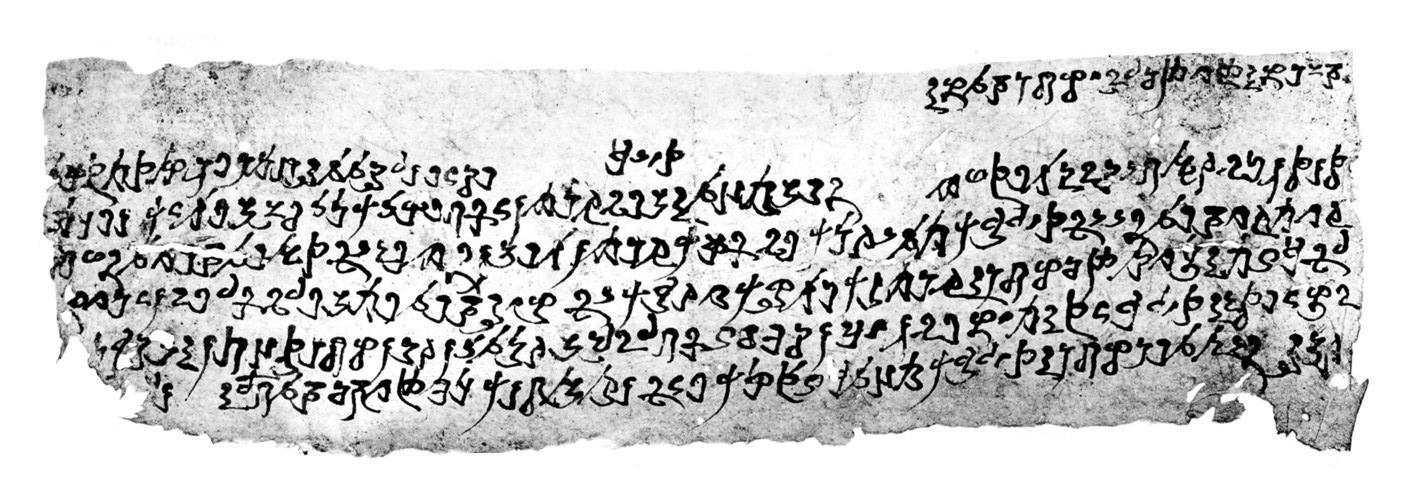
Kharosthi document found in Loulan by Aurel Stein

Aurel Stein made further excavations in 1906 and 1914 around the old lake of Lop Nur and identified many sites in the area. He designated these sites with the letter L (for Loulan), followed by a letter of the alphabet (A to T) allocated in the chronological order the sites were visited. Stein recovered many artifacts, including various documents, a wool-pile carpet fragment, some yellow silk, and Gandharan architectural wood carvings.

L.A. – A walled settlement lying to the north of the lake. The thick wall is made of packed earth and straw and was over 305 m (1,001 ft) on each side and 6.1 m (20 ft) thick at the base. It contains a large stupa and some administrative buildings and was occupied for a long time. It is usually thought to be the city of Loulan.
L.B. – A site with stupas at 13 km (8.1 mi) to the northwest of the L.A.
L.E. – A fortified town lying 30 km (19 mi) to the northeast of L.A. It is the only known city in the region with a northern gate. Since a northern gate was mentioned in the Han Chinese text about the assassination of the king of Loulan, it has therefore been suggested to be the capital of Loulan in the 1st century BCE, before the Han Chinese gained control the region. Others, however, argue that the northern gate does not refer to Loulan but Chang'an. The site was occupied until the late 3rd century CE.
L.F. – 10 km (6.2 mi) to the northwest of L.A., containing building foundations and a cemetery. Archaeologists discovered the body of a young man in a wooden coffin, wearing a felt hat and leather boots and lying under a woolen blanket. A bunch of ephedra twigs was placed beside him in a similar fashion to many much older burials found in the region.
L.K. – A walled city to the west of the lake with only a gateway in the city wall. It has been identified as Haitou by some archaeologists.
L.L. – A fortress lying 5 km (3.1 mi) northwest of L.K., similar in construction but smaller.

=== Chinese archaeological expedition, 1979–1980 ===
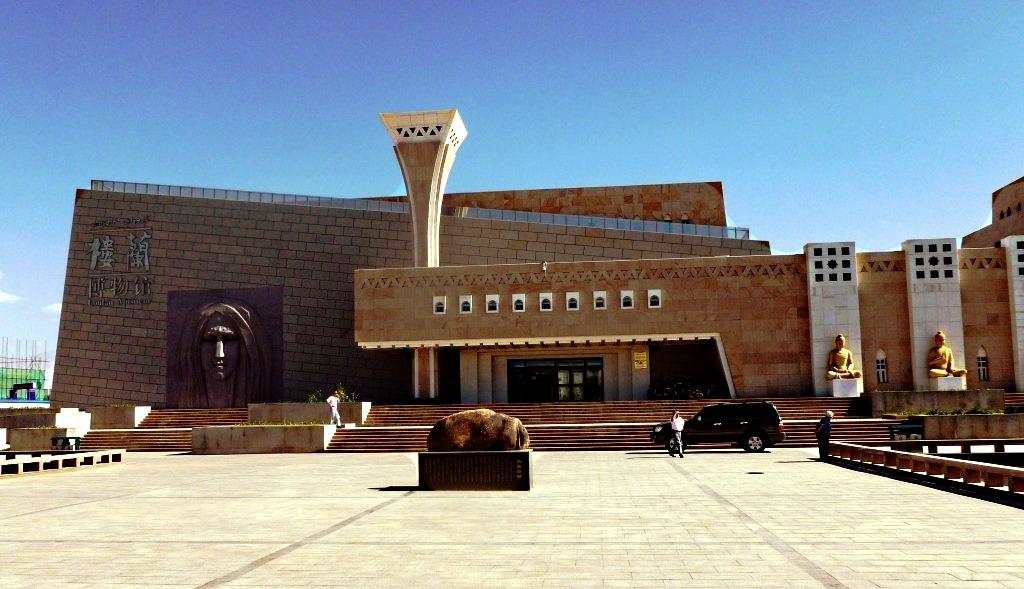
Loulan Museum, Charklik

In 1979 and 1980, three archaeological expeditions sponsored by the Chinese Academy of Social Sciences Xinjiang Branch performed excavations in Loulan. They discovered a canal 15 feet (4.6 m) deep and 55 feet (17 m) wide running through Loulan from northwest to southeast, a 32-foot (9.8 m) high earthen dome-shaped Buddhist stupa; and a home 41 feet (12 m) long by 28 feet (8.5 m) wide, apparently for a Chinese official, housing 3 rooms and supported by wooden pillars. They also collected 797 objects from the area, including vessels of wood, bronze objects, jewellery and coins, and Mesolithic stone tools Other reported (2003) finds in the area include additional mummies and burial grounds, ephedra sticks, a string bracelet that holds a hollowed jade stone, a leather pouch, a woolen loincloth, a wooden mask painted red and with large nose and teeth, boat-shaped coffins, a bow with arrows and a straw basket.

== Genetics ==
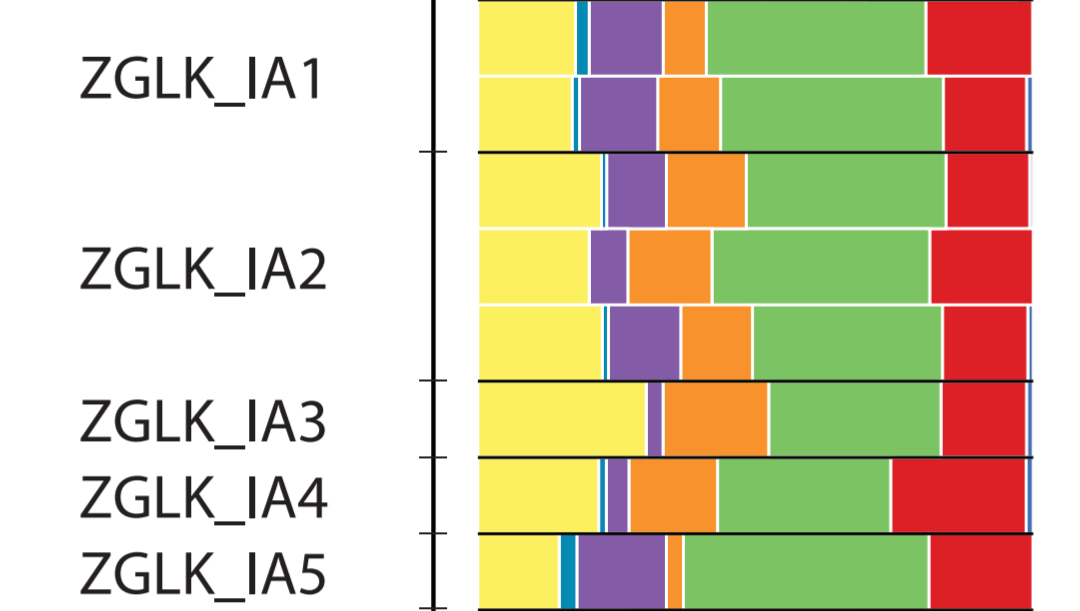
Breakdowns of autosomal DNA for five inhabitants of Loulan. Eastern Hunter Gatherer/Ancient North Eurasian ( EHG/ANE), Caucasian Hunter-Gatherer/Iran Neolithic Farmer ( CHG/INF), Anatolian Neolithic ( ), Ancient Northeast Asian hunter-gatherer ( ANA), Yellow River Neolithic Farmer ( YRNF), Ancient Ancestral South Indians ( AASI) and Ancient Paleo-Siberian ( APS)

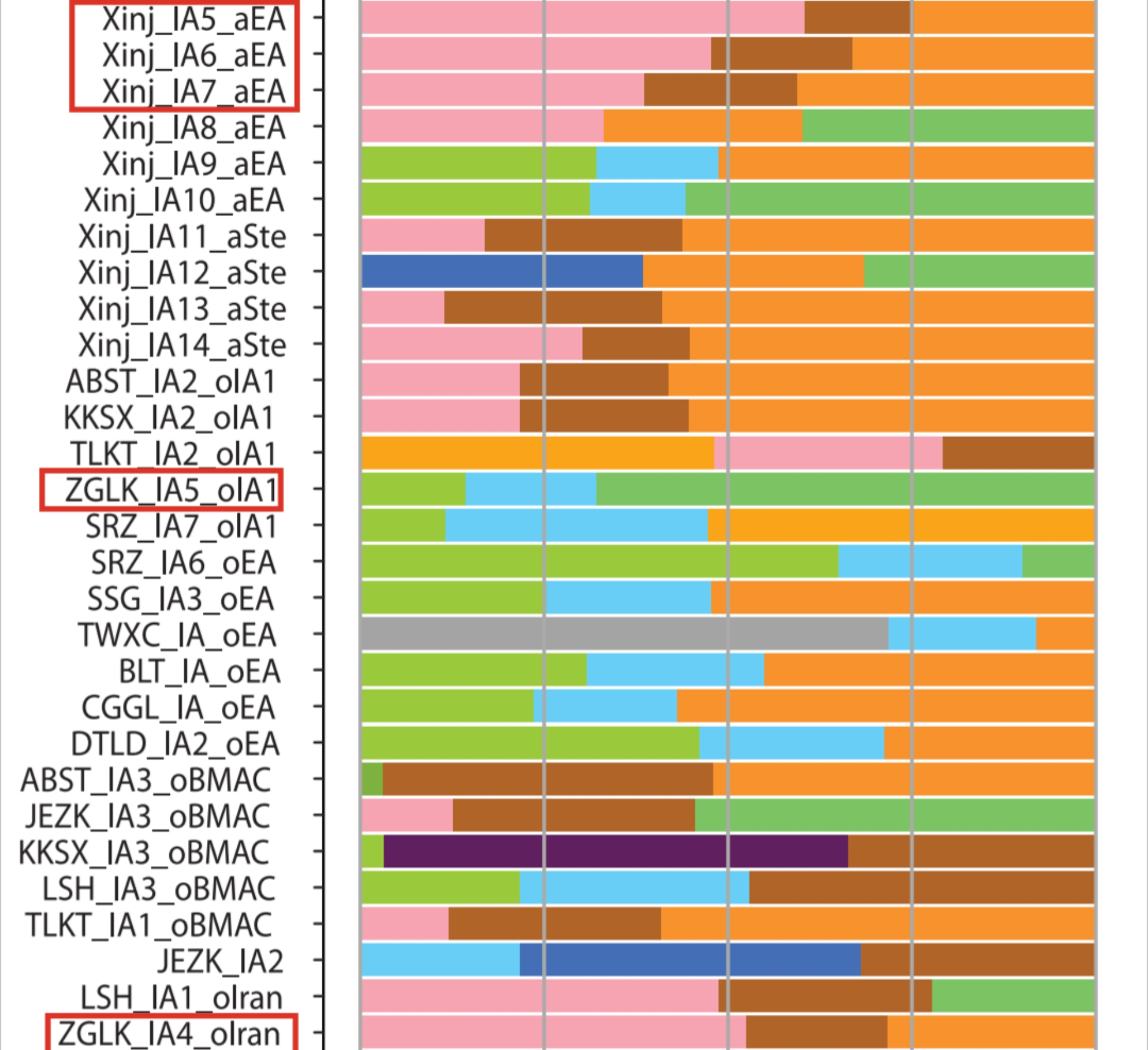
A comparison of a wider range of contemporaneous individuals from Central Asia and Siberia (including the Loulan population). Andronovo culture ( ) Afanasevo culture ( ), BMAC ( ), Tarim mummies ( ), Baikal HG ( ) and Yellow River Neolithic Farmer ( )

Research into the population genetics of the inhabitants of Loulan showed diverse ancestry, including significant components from ancient west Eurasian steppe sources, as well as north-east Asia, Central Asia, East Asia, south-west Asia and South Asia.

The Loulan people had origins including steppe pastoralists associated with the Afanasevo and Andronovo cultures, along with significant influence from Baikal hunter-gatherers, Bactria–Margiana Archaeological Complex (BMAC), Yellow River neolithic farmers, Caucasian Hunter-Gatherer (CHG) and Iran Neolithic Farmers; there were also minor contributions from Ancient Ancestral South Indians and Ancient Paleo-Siberians.

Mitochondrial DNA haplogroups – an indication of the diversity of maternal lineages – amongst the inhabitants of Loulan included H5a, T1a, R2, HV12, J1b, N1a, T2b, D4i, H2b, U5a, C7b.

In terms of paternal lineages, male Loulan inhabitants were mainly haplogroup R1b, although hg O1a was also present.

== See also ==
- Charklik
- Cherchen
- Endere
- Gushi culture
- Lop Nur
- Miran
- Niya
- Xiaohe Tomb complex

== Sources ==
- Hill, John E. (2009). Through the Jade Gate to Rome: A study of the silk routes during the later Han, 1st to 2nd centuries CE. Charleston, SC: Book Surge. ISBN 978-1-4392-2134-1 – via Google Books.
- Hulsewé, A.F.P. (1979). China in Central Asia: The early stage 125 BC – AD 23. Leiden, NL: Brill. ISBN 978-9004058842 – via Google Books. "annotated translation of chapters 61 and 96 of the History of the Former Han Dynasty"
- Mallory, J.P.; Mair, Victor H. (2000). The Tarim Mummies: Ancient China and the mystery of the earliest peoples from the west. London, UK: Thames & Hudson. ISBN 0-500-05101-1 – via Internet Archive (archive.org).
- Watson, Burton (1993). Records of the Grand Historian: Han Dynasty II (revised ed.). New York, NY: Columbia University Press. ISBN 0-231-08166-9.
