= Garland bearers =

Garland bearers

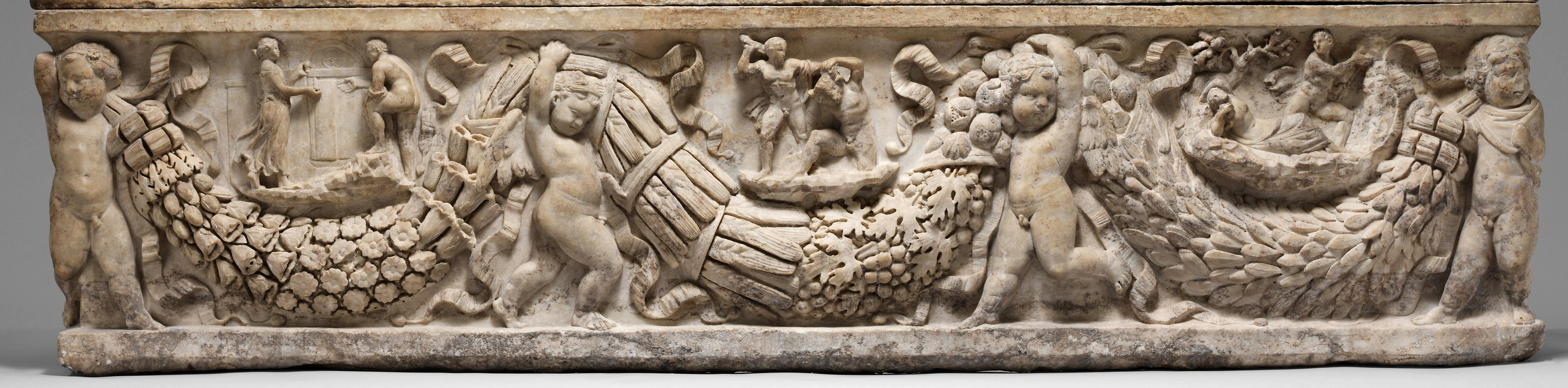
Garland bearers on a Roman sarcophagus, found in the vicinity of Rome, 130-150 CE. Metropolitan Museum of Art

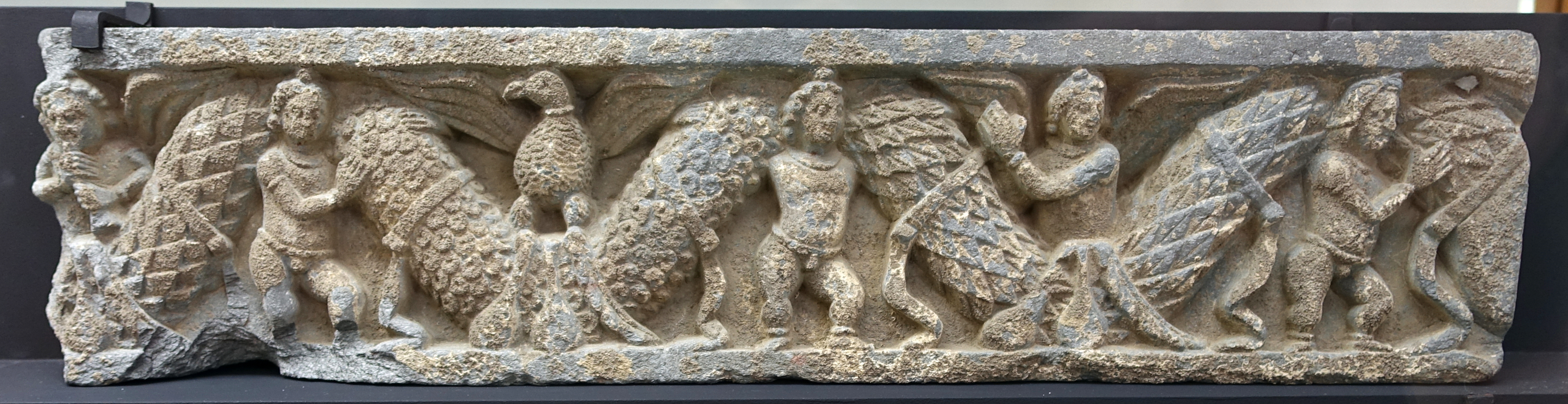
Garland and amorini, Greco-Buddhist art of Gandhara, India, c. 2nd-3rd century CE. Matsuoka Museum of Art

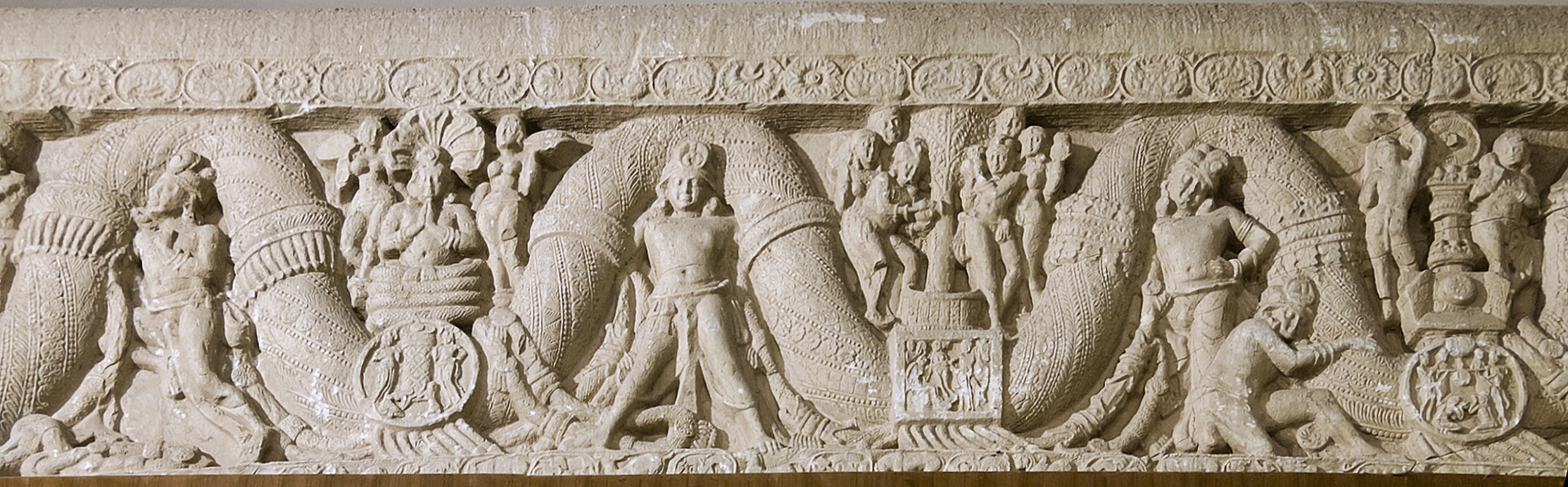
Garland bearers, Amaravati stupa, India. Chennai Government Museum

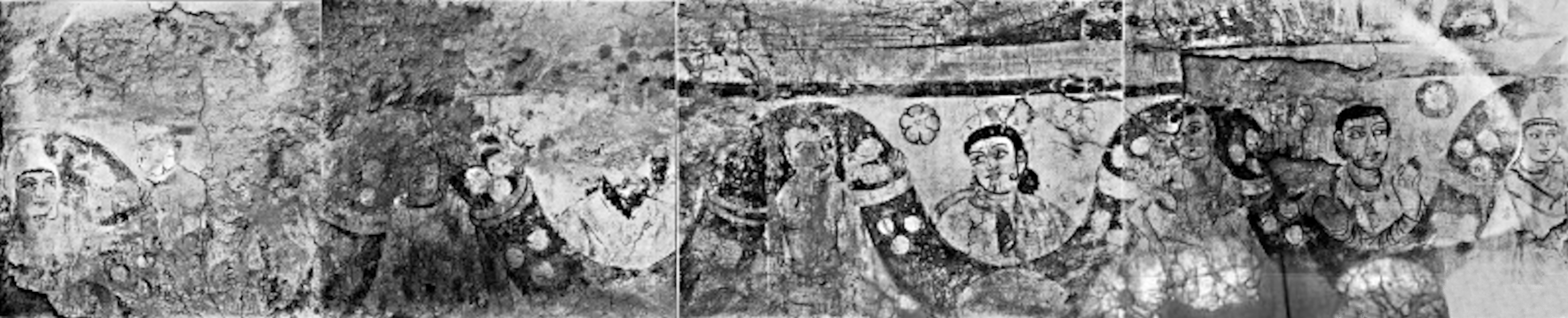
Garland bearers, Miran, China, 3rd century CE

Garlands bearers, typically in the form of small naked putti holding up a continuous garland very large in relation to their size, formed a popular ornamental design in classical arts, from the Greco-Roman world to India, with ramifications as far as China. In Europe they were revived in the Renaissance, and continued in later periods.

== Greco-Roman art ==
The garland-bearer design was extremely popular in the Mediterranean. It first appeared at the end of the Hellenistic period, and its popularity expanded during the Roman period. The design reached a peak of popularity in the 2nd century CE, adorning sarcophagi made in Asia Minor to be sold in Rome.

Greek garland bearer designs tend to be continuous, and the garlands are furnished with leaves and stems. Roman garland bearer designs are segmented and often use flowers and fruits for decoration.

Garland bearers were also particularly associated to the cult of Dionysos.

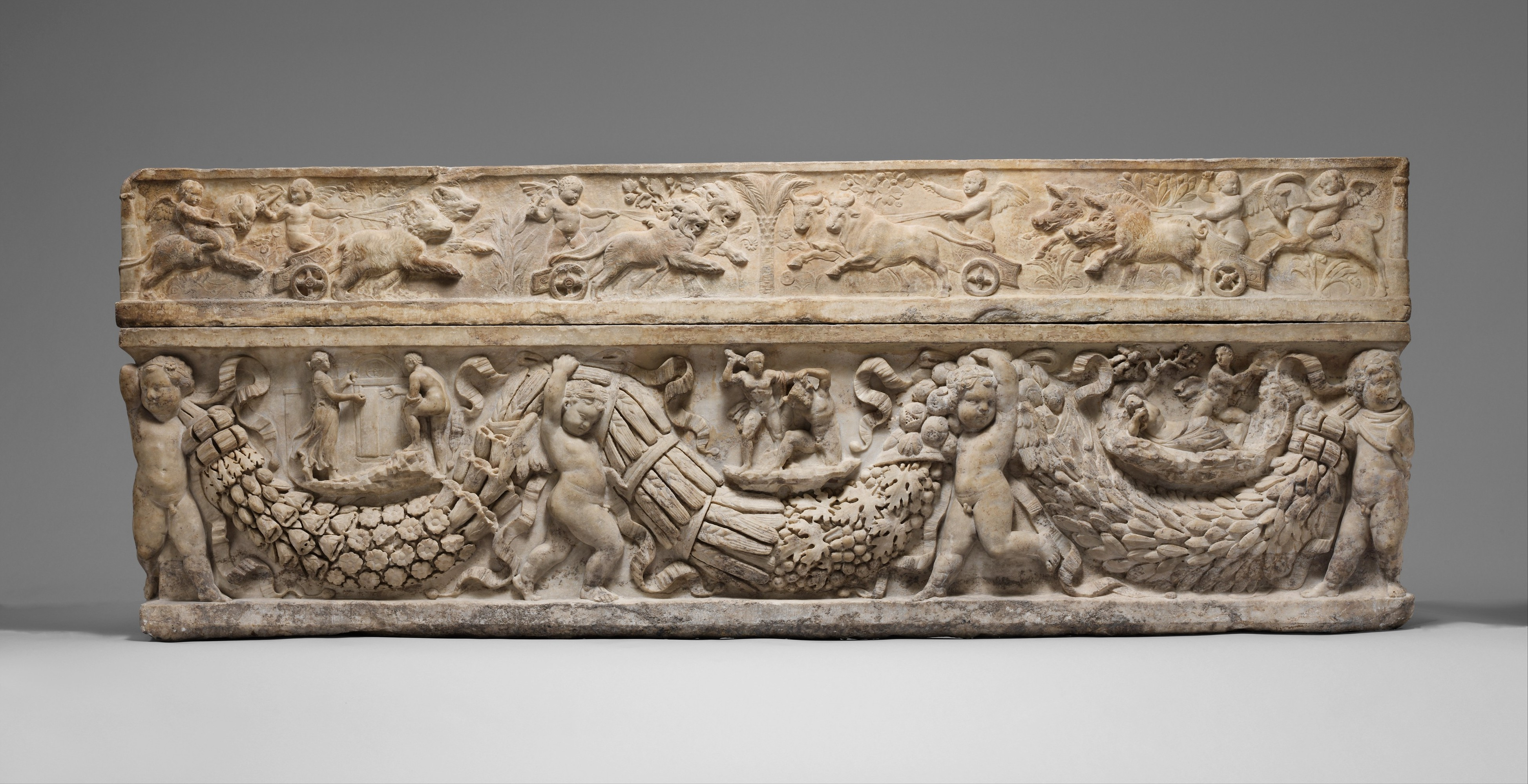
Garland bearers on a Roman sarcophagus, 130-150 CE.

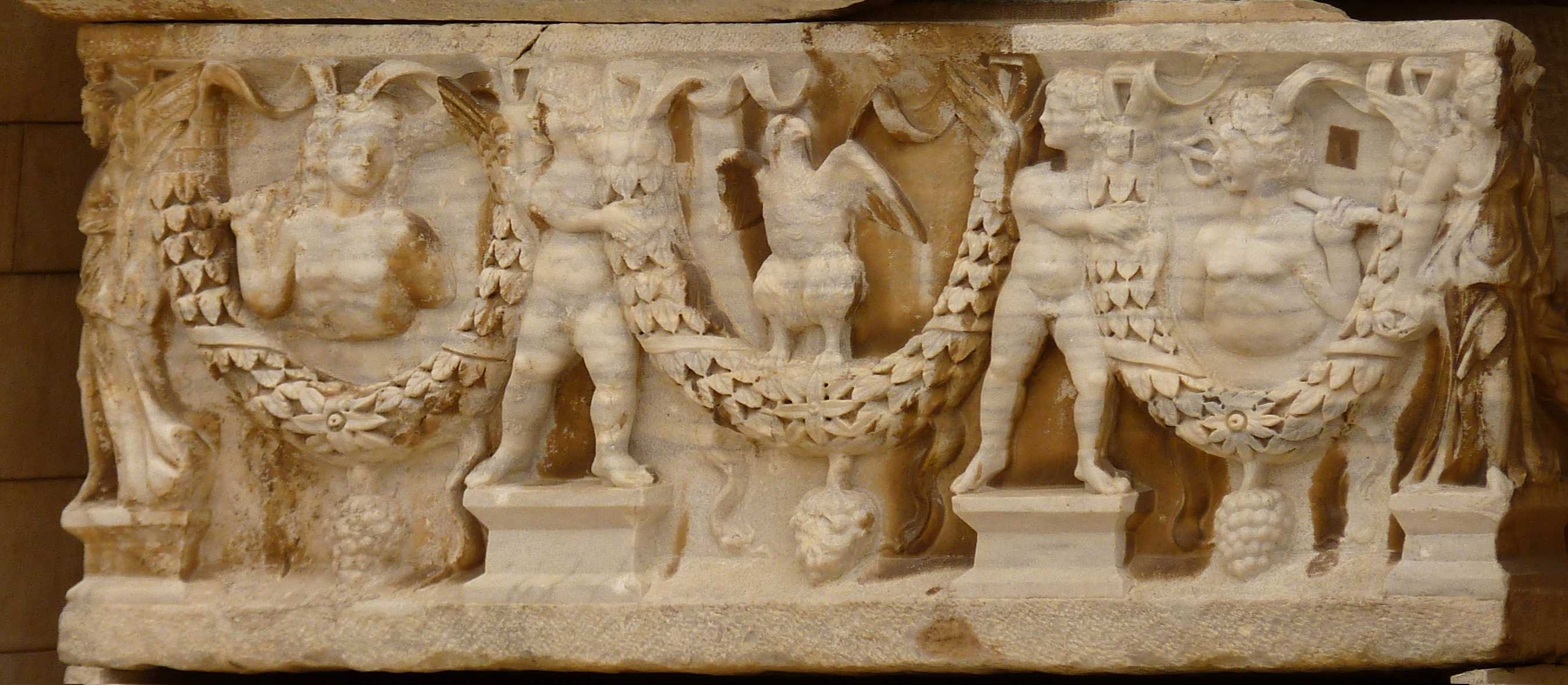
Greco-Roman garland bearers, Rockefeller Museum

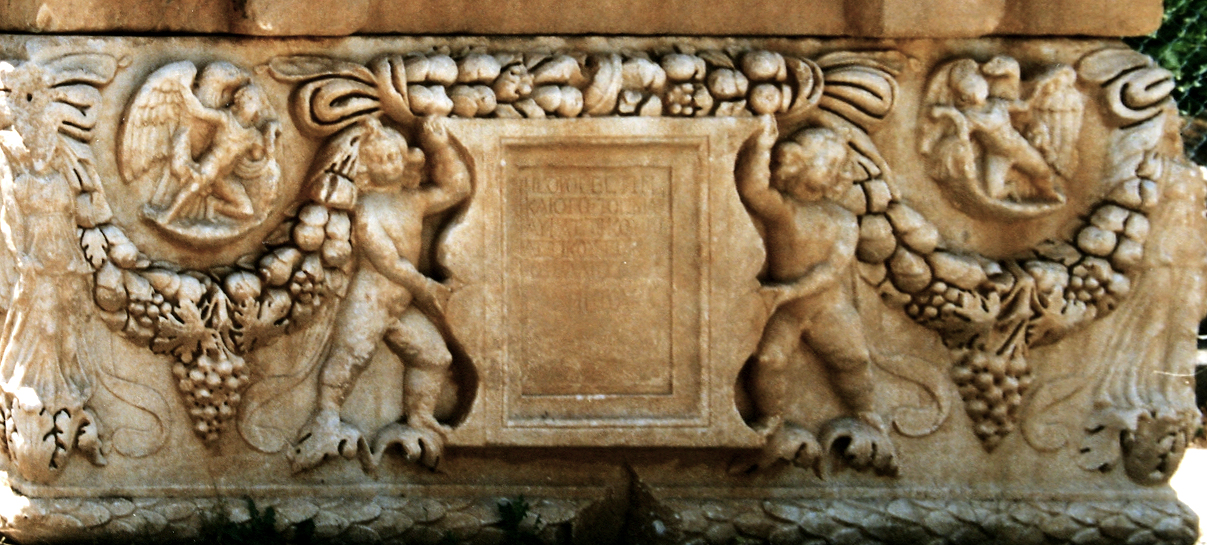
Garland bearers on a sarcophagus, in Aphrodisias.

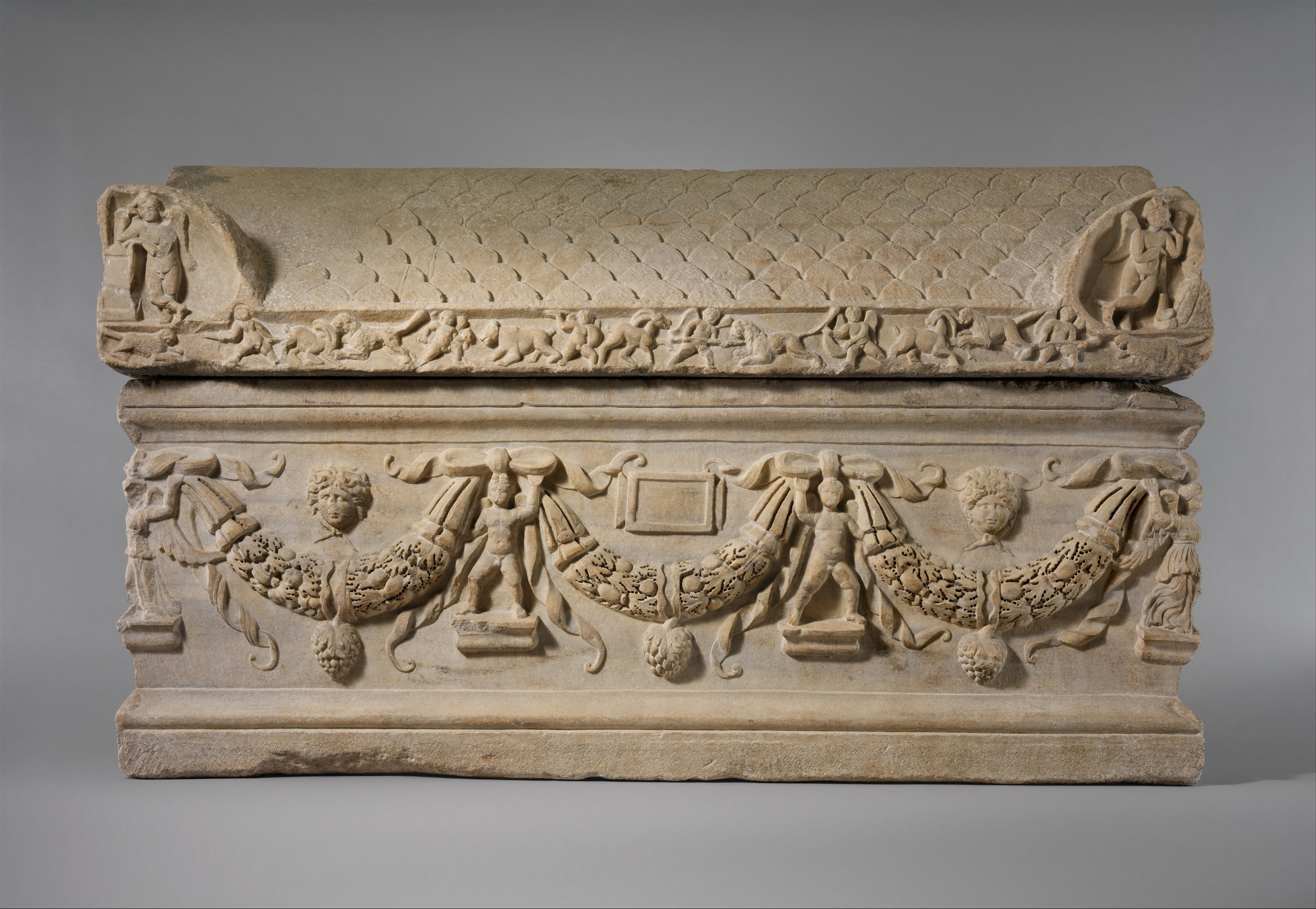
Roman marble sarcophagus with segmented garlands decorated with flowers and fruits, 200-225 CE, Tarsus, Cilicia (modern Turkey).

== Central Asia ==
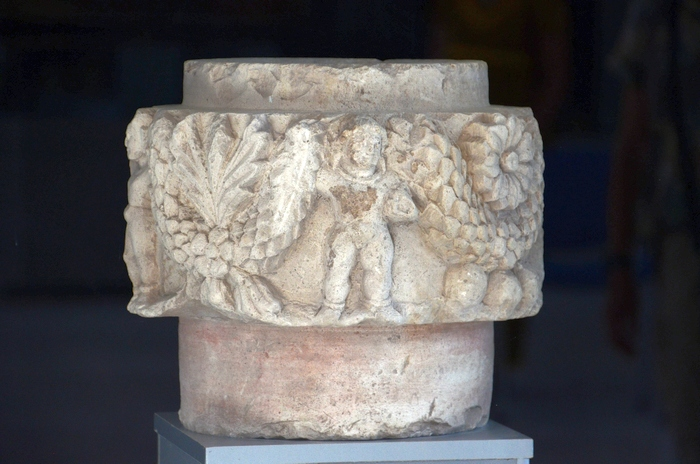
Capital with a figure showing features of Buddha and Heracles (100-200 CE), Old Termez Archaeological Museum.

== Indian art ==
The erotes or putti holding garlands is one of the most common motif of the Greco-Buddhist art of Gandhara. According to John Boardman, they find their origin in Hellenistic designs, rather than Roman ones. The garlands had an important role in decorating Buddhist stupas.

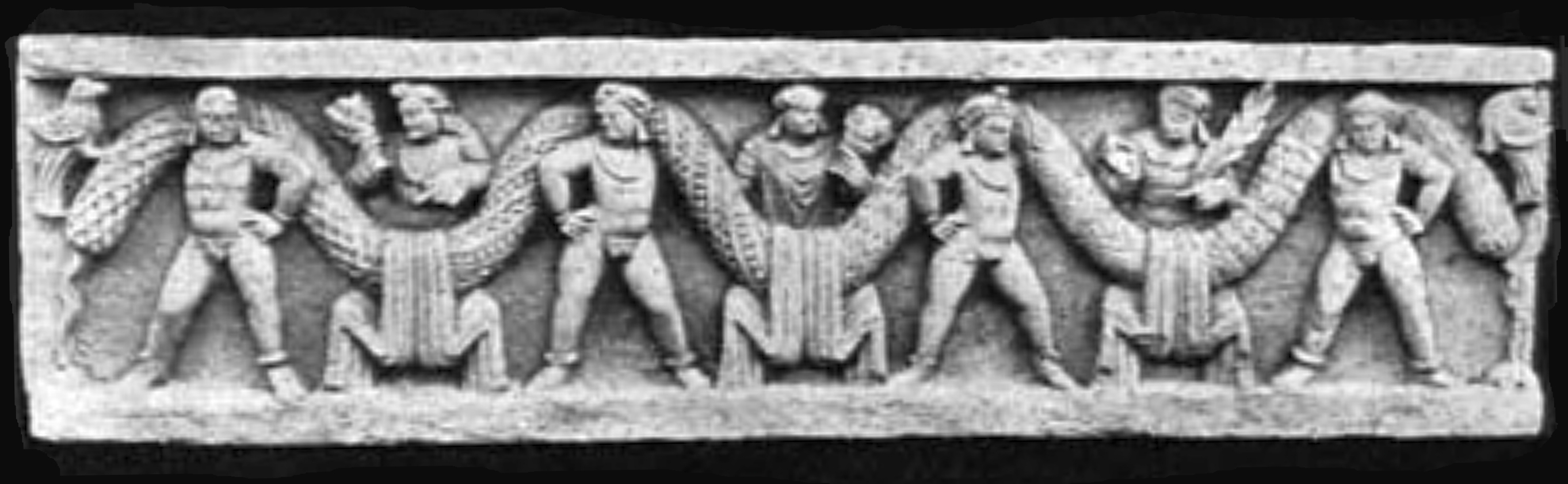
Yakshas holding Garlands, Peshawar Museum.

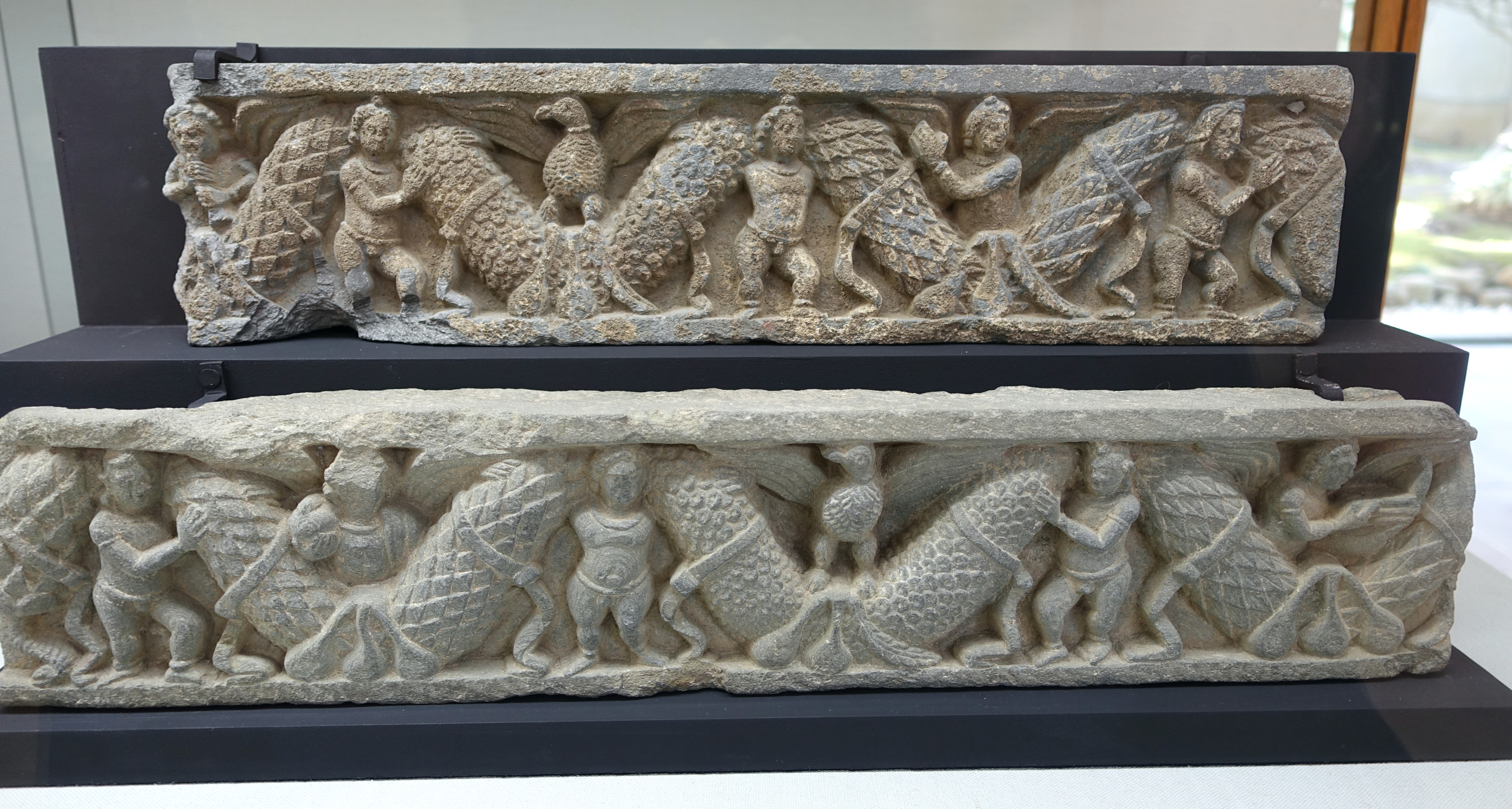
Garland and amorini, Gandhara, c. 2nd-3rd century CE

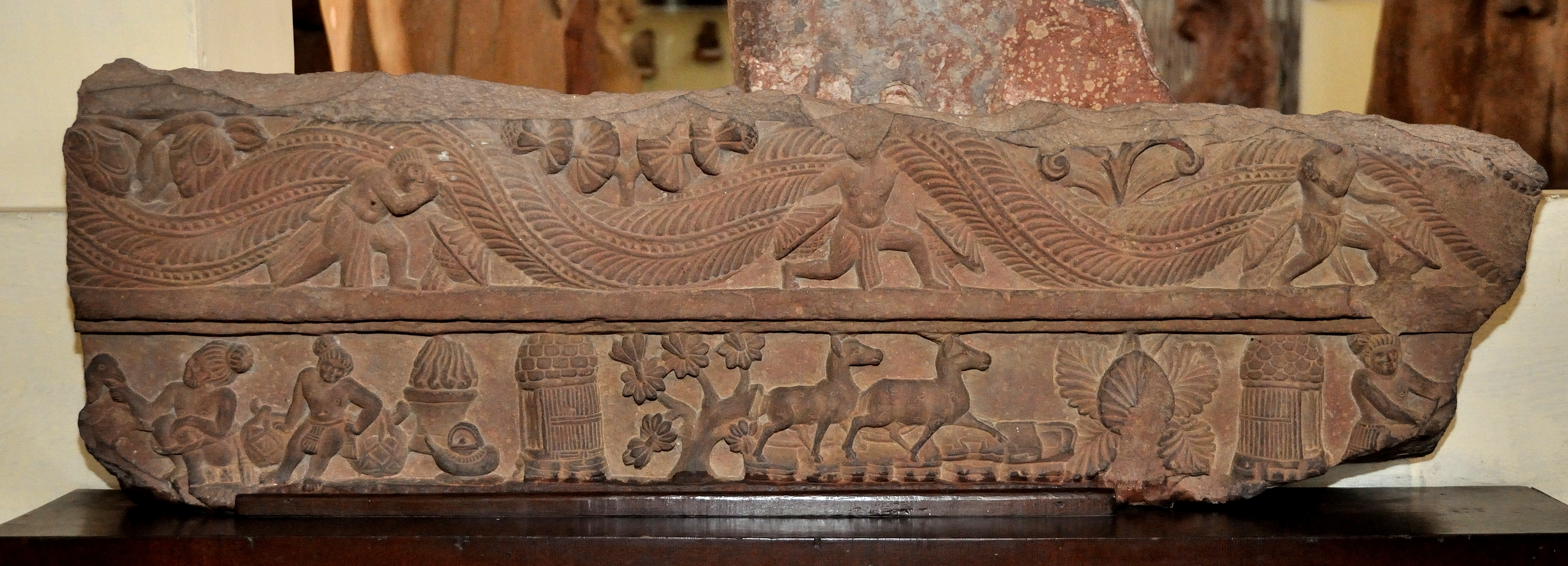
Garland bearers and Romaka Jataka (25-50 CE), Mathura Museum

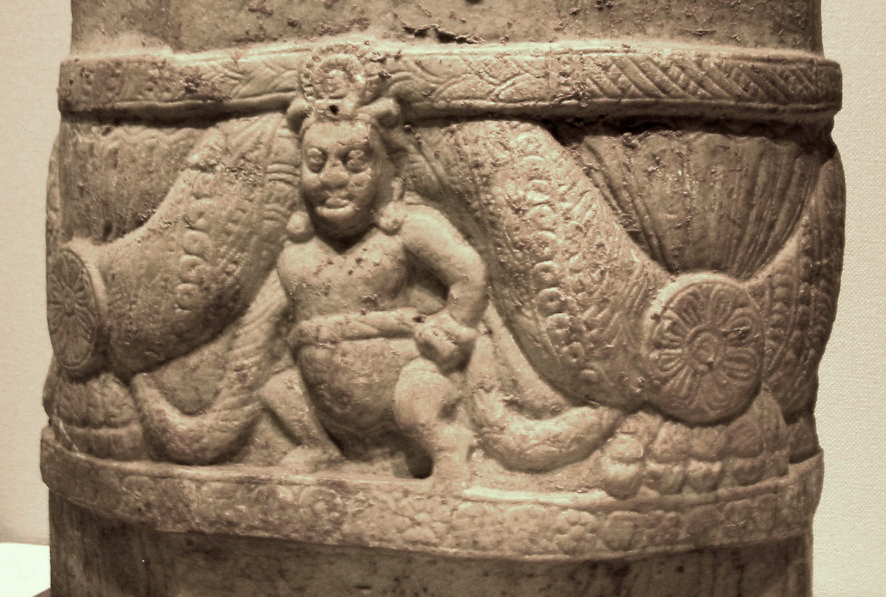
Yaksha holding a garland, Amaravati stupa.

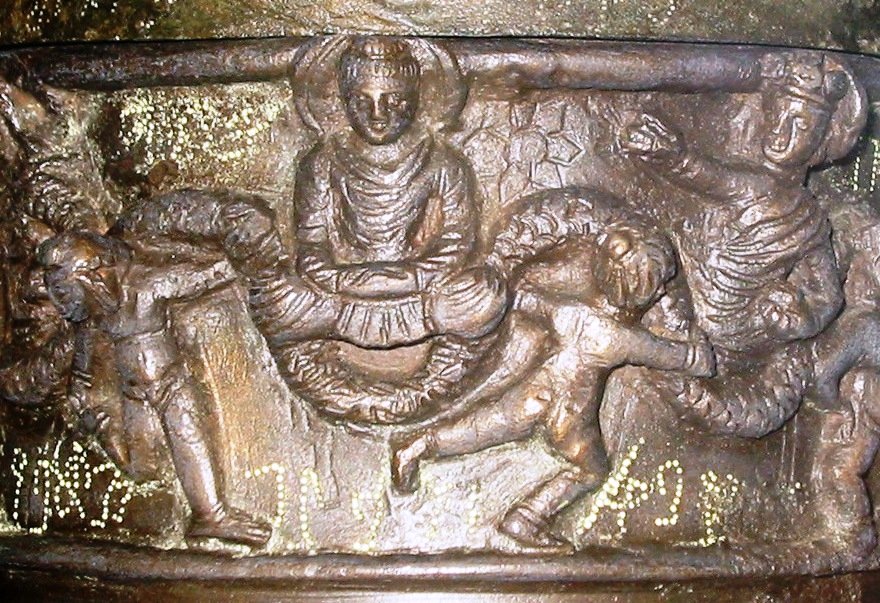
Erotes, garland and the Buddha on the Kanishka casket

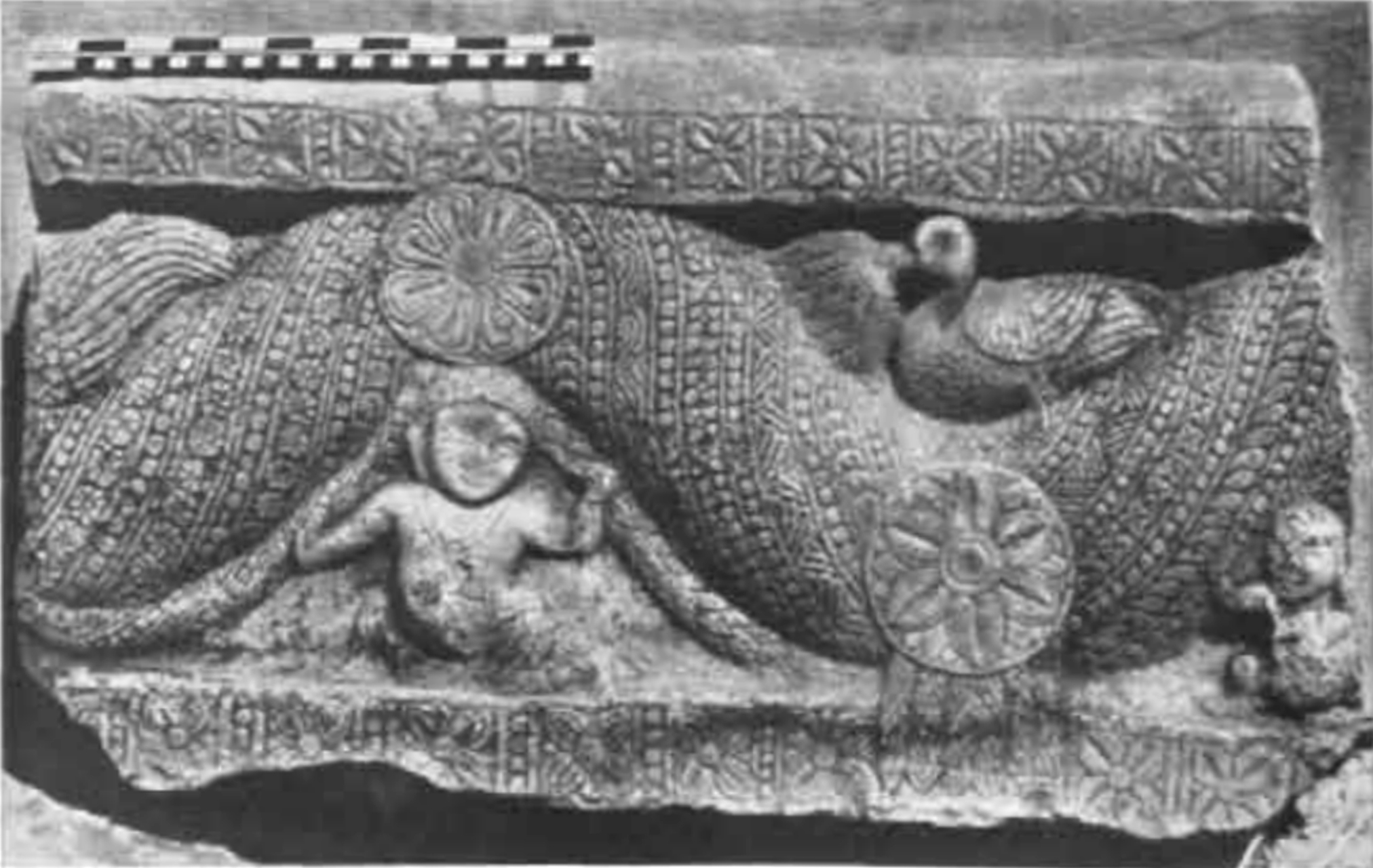
Limestone coping fragment, Ter, Maharashtra.

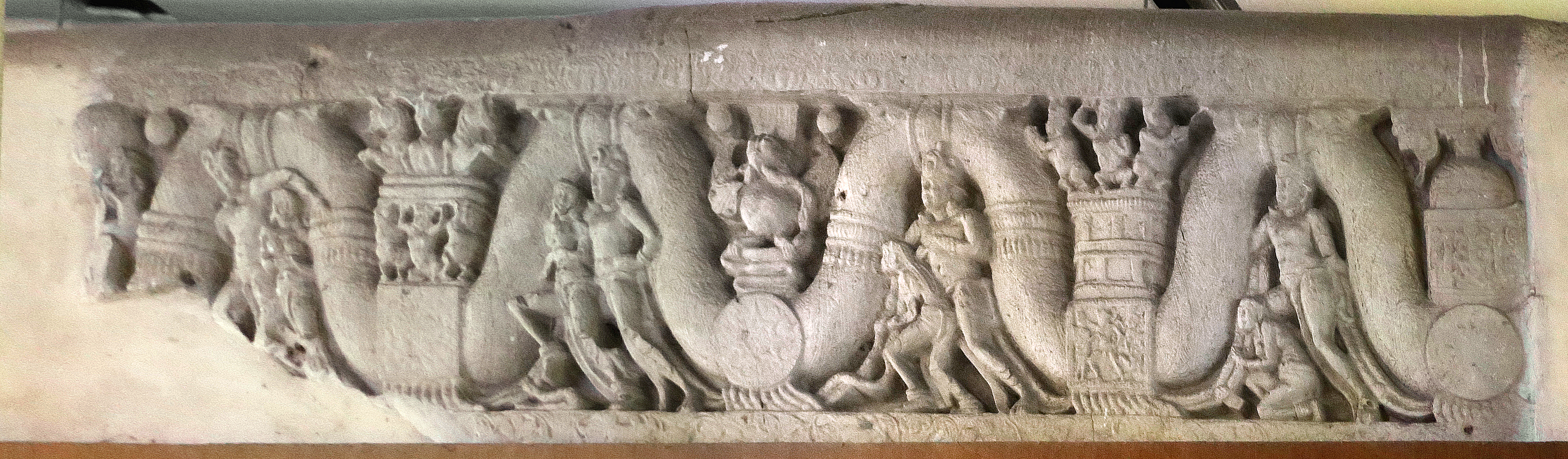
Garland bearers, Amaravati stupa, India. Chennai Government Museum

== China ==
Location of Miran in China.

The garland bearer design can be seen in Buddhist frescoes in Miran, China, from the 3rd century CE.

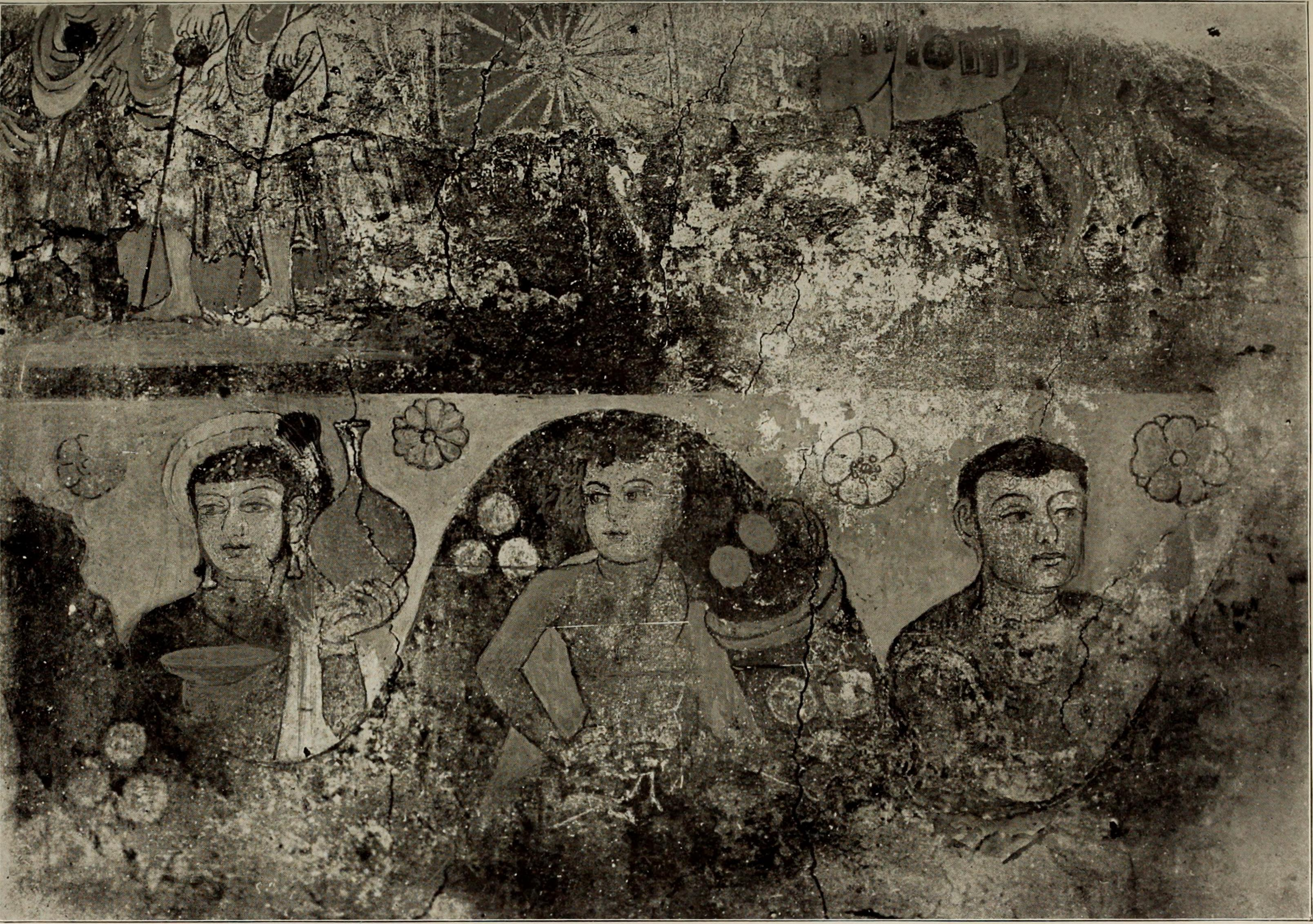
Garland bearers on a frescoe at Miran

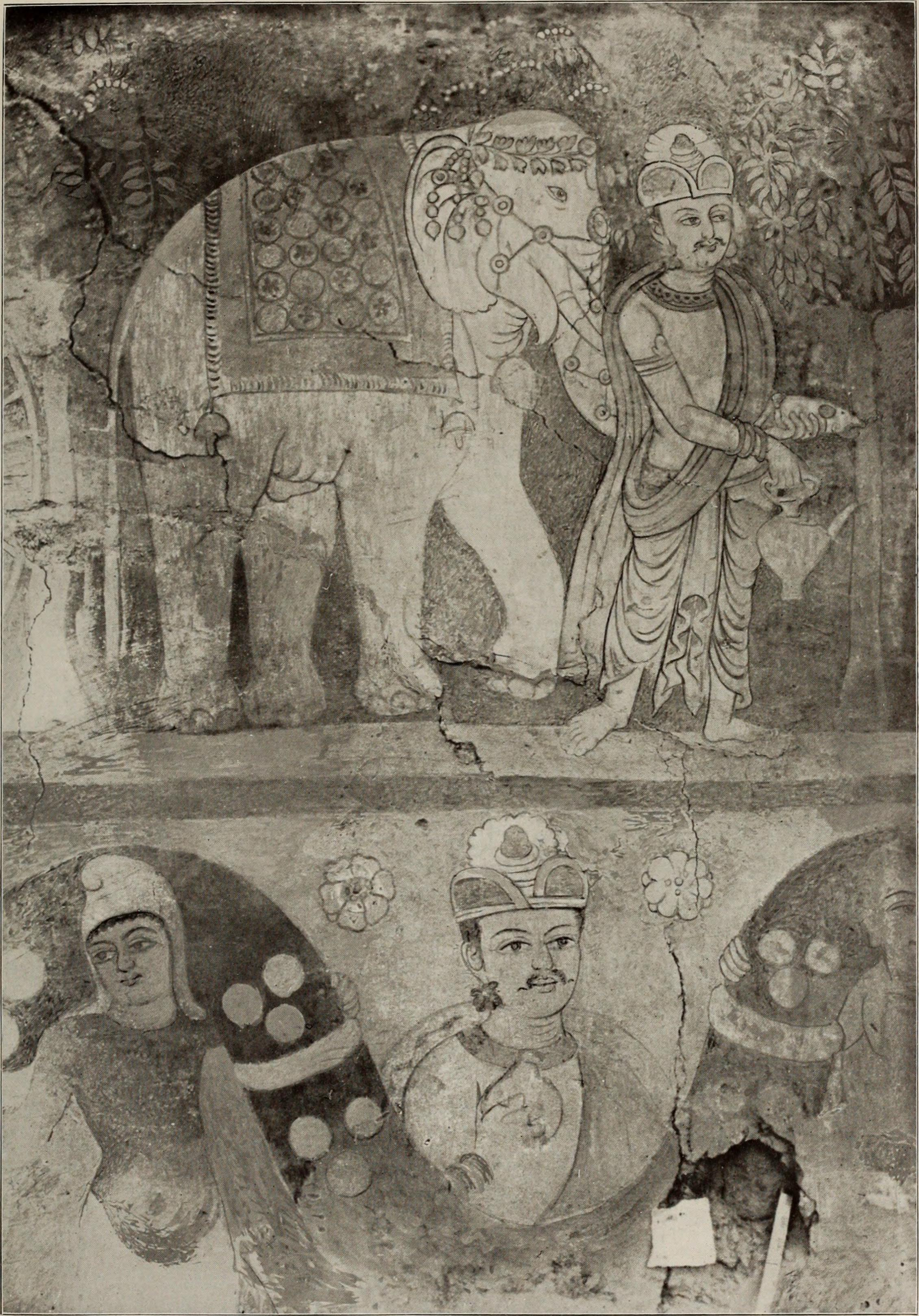
Garland bearers on a frescoe at Miran
