= 1902 Turkestan earthquake =

Earthquake near the China–Kyrgyzstan border

1902 Kashgar earthquake
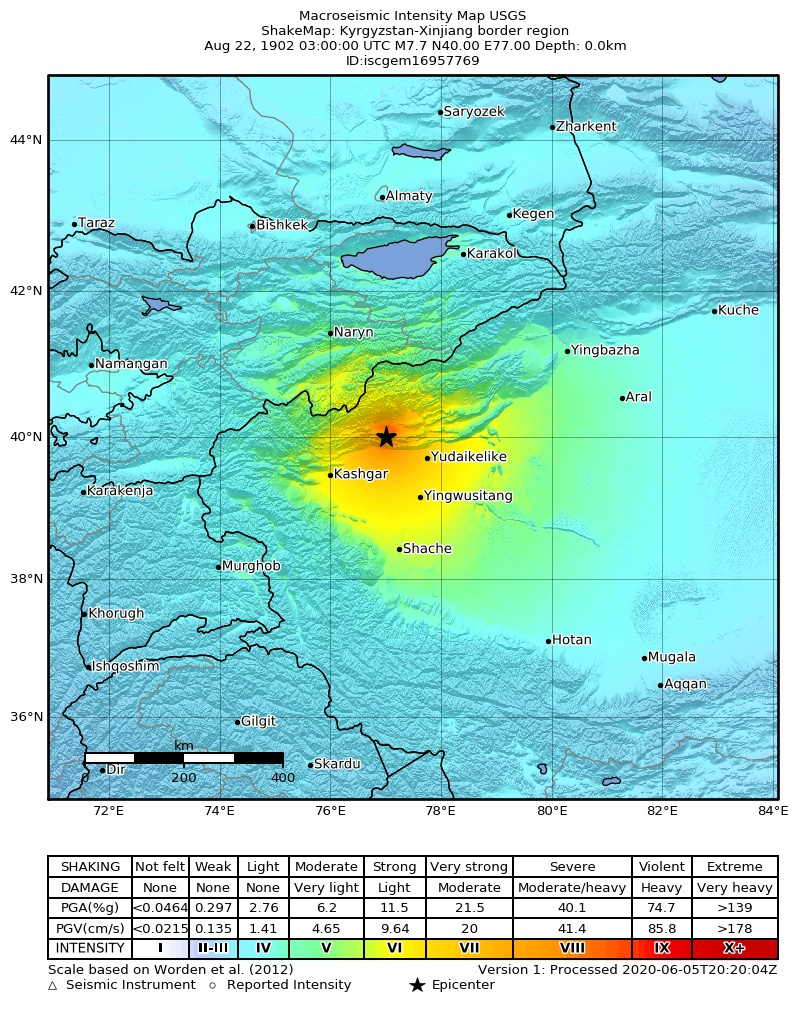
- USGS ShakeMap

- Location within China
- UTC time: 1902-08-22 03:00:22
- ISC event: 16957769
- USGS-ANSS: ComCat
- Local date: August 22, 1902
- Local time: 09:00:22
- Magnitude: 7.7 M_{w}
- Depth: 18.0 km (11.2 mi)
- Epicenter: 39.87°N 76.42°E
- Type: Thrust
- Areas affected: China & Kyrgyzstan
- Max. intensity: RFS X (Extremely high intensity tremor)
- Aftershocks: Many. Largest was a M_{s} 6.8–7.3
- Casualties: 5,650–10,000 dead

The 1902 Turkestan earthquake (also known as the Artush or Kashgar earthquake) devastated Xinjiang, China, near the Kyrgyzstan border. It occurred on August 22, 1902, at 03:00:22 (09:00:22 local time) with an epicenter in the Tien Shan mountains. The thrust earthquake measured 7.7 on the moment magnitude scale (M_{w}) and had a depth of 18 km (11 mi).

The Tien Shan mountains is situated in a zone of complex convergence caused by the Indian–Eurasian plate interaction. This zone is actively deforming—accommodated by active thrust faults responsible for seismic activity. The mainshock was preceded by an intense series of foreshocks in the years prior. Many aftershocks followed, several were larger than magnitude 6.0 and the largest measured 6.8–7.3. Aftershocks were recorded for three years. Additional shocks were recorded over a decade after the mainshock.

An estimated 5,650–10,000 people were killed in the mainshock. Widespread destruction occurred—at least 30,000 homes were destroyed. Shaking was felt across an area of 927,000 km^{2} (358,000 sq mi). The effects of the earthquake led government officials to relieve victims of taxes and provide compensation.

== Tectonic setting ==
The Pamir–Tien Shan region is situated in a broad deformation zone caused by the ongoing collision of the Indian plate with the Eurasian plate. This deformation led to the formation of the Tien Shan mountains. Its formation began in two stages during the Paleozoic era—first (southern Tien Shan) in the Late Devonian–early Carboniferous and later (northern Tien Shan) in the late Carboniferous–early Permian. Before the Indian subcontinent collided with Eurasia, there were island arcs and microcontinents (terranes) between the two landmasses. These terranes were later accreted to Eurasia as the northward-moving Indian subcontinent collided, and are now in present-day Central Asia. The collision of terranes and island arcs as well as the collision with Eurasia eventually formed the Tien Shan mountains. Ancient suture zones mark the boundary where these collisions took place. The region is dominated by large, north and south dipping thrust faults along the southern edge of the Tien Shan mountains, and the northern boundary of the Tarim Basin. The Tien Shan actively accommodates crustal shortening by underthrusting of the Tarim Basin in the south and overthrusting of the Pamirs in the west southwest. Most of the 20 ± 2 mm (0.787 ± 0.079 in)/year shortening is accommodated along its southern boundary. The northwestern Tien Shan is seismically active—earthquakes are caused by thrust faulting and usually have shallow focal depths of 15 km (9.3 mi) or less.

== Earthquake ==
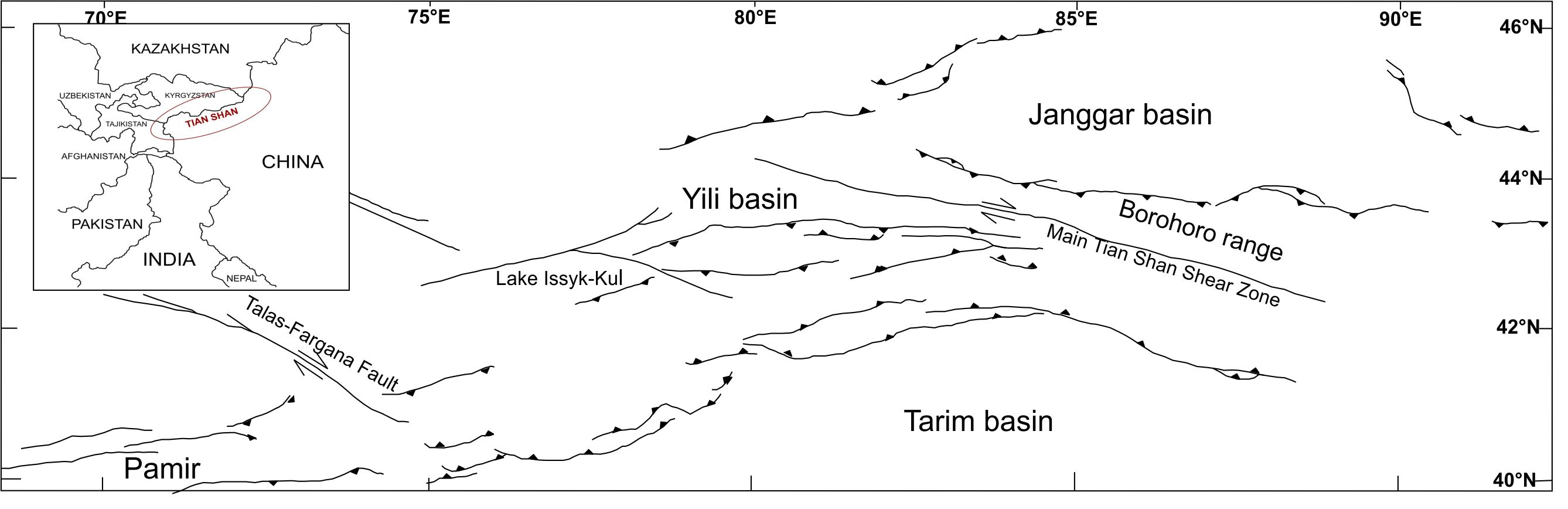
Major fault structures in the vicinity of the Tien Shan range. The earthquake ruptured a thrust fault at the base of the range, or north of the Tarim Basin

The mainshock was recorded on seismographs across Europe, Cape Town, Toronto, Irkutsk, and Christchurch. It is the largest and earliest instrumentally recorded earthquake in the Tien Shan region. Chinese earthquake catalogs have placed the surface-wave magnitude (M_{s}) at 8.25. Seismologists Beno Gutenberg and Charles Francis Richter also assigned mb (body wave magnitude) 7.9 and M_{s} 8.6, respectively. These values were likely overestimated due to the lack of a dense seismic network to constrained the magnitude.

=== Characteristics ===
In Journal of Seismology, a 2017 analysis of historical seismogram records reproduced in subject books allowed for a quantitative reassessment of the earthquake. The researchers determined that the earthquake initiated at a depth of 18 km (11 mi) with its epicenter also relocated (39.87°N 76.42°E) east from previous determinations. The source fault was a west-southwest–east-southeast striking fault dipping towards the north at a 30° angle. The slip rake was 90°, incidating pure thrust faulting. The seismic moment was further constrained by performing scaling laws against the waveforms, yielding a moment magnitude of 7.7±0.3 and surface-wave magnitude of 7.8±0.4.

A possible candidate for causing the earthquake was the Tuotegongbaizi-Aerpaleike Fault (TAF) located at the southern flanks of the Tien Shan range as it is large enough to generate a rupture comparable to a magnitude 7.7 event. Based on scaling laws between magnitude and rupture size for thrust events, a comparable-sized event would produce a 110 km (68 mi) long break. The TAF is 200 km (120 mi) long, and has dips beneath the range with varying dip angles of 25–60° northward. The fault trace also runs through the area with the highest seismic intensity.

=== Effects ===
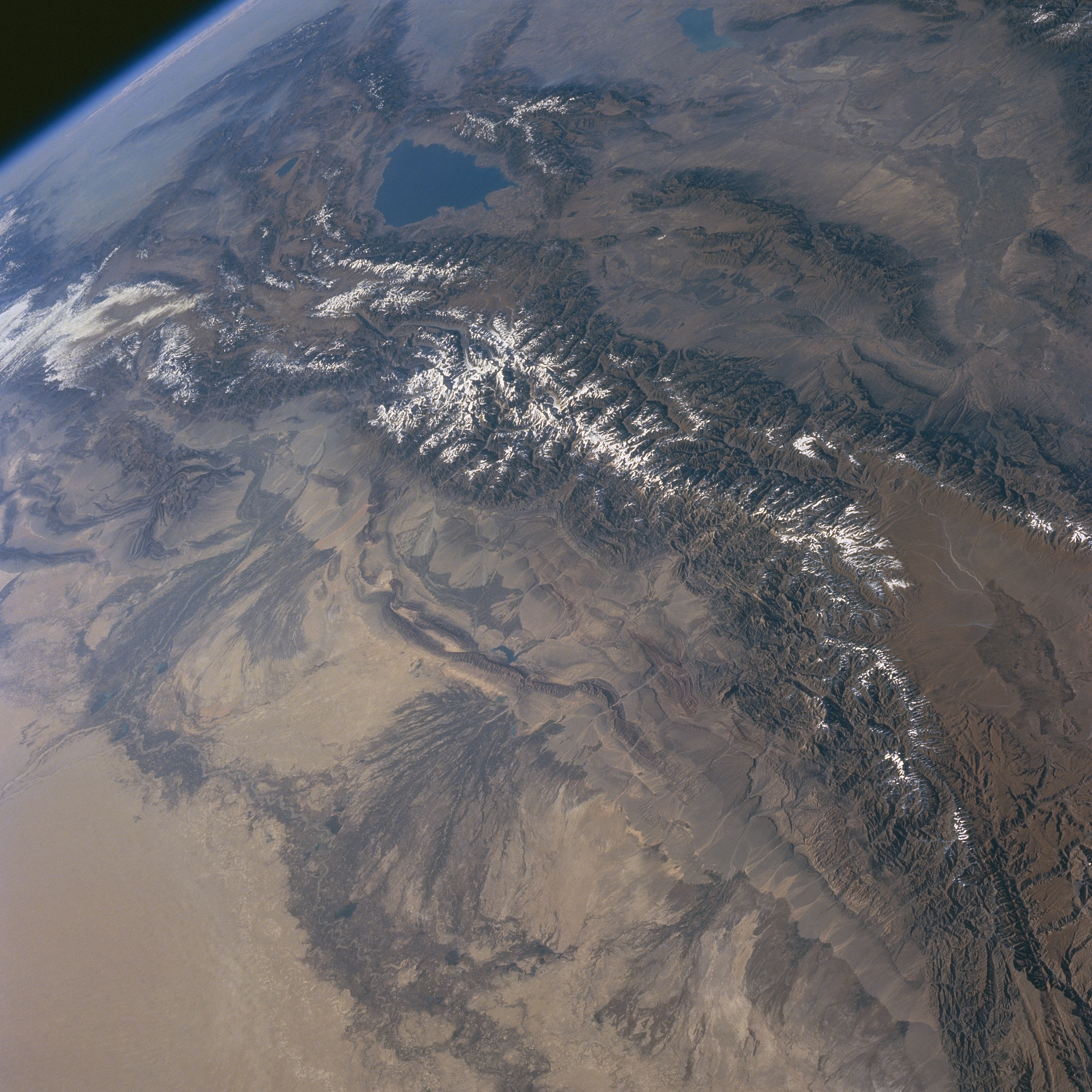
The Tien Shan mountains from space

The earthquake was felt strongly across Central Asia for 927,000 km^{2} (358,000 sq mi), extending from south of Tashkent to north of Almaty. In Xinjiang, it was felt in Yining, Ürümqi, Korla, Taxkorgan and Hotan. It had a maximum intensity of X on the Modified Mercalli, Rossi–Forel, and Medvedev–Sponheuer–Karnik scales. Isoseismal X was felt over an elliptical area for 7,500 km^{2} (2,900 sq mi), in which the cities of Artux, Songtak, Halajun, and Ahu were within. Shaking occurred in an east–west direction at the southern base of the Tien Shan. Isoseismal IX covered 18,200 km^{2} (7,000 sq mi), extending east–west from Wuqia to Karaqi. It was felt as far south in Kashgar, Shule, Shufu and Jiashi. Isoseismal VIII was felt in Kangsu, Toyun, Uqturpan, and Akto. It was also felt strongly in the counties of Yopurga, Kalpin, Yengisar and Maralbexi.

=== Foreshocks ===
Seismicity in the area prior to the mainshock had been relatively high. Multiple earthquakes of ~M_{s} 6.0 occurred, however, a large 650 km (400 mi) seismic gap existed. Historical records of earthquakes date back up to 10 years before 1902. In 1892, an M_{s} 6.3 event struck southeast of the 1902 mainshock. After a M_{s} 7.5 earthquake struck Tashkorgan in 1895, seismicity progressed north towards Atushi. The city was affected by a destructive earthquake (M_{s} 6.0+) once every year from 1896 to 1898. This high rate of seismicity ceased from 1899 and leading to the mainshock. Between 10 and 20 days before the mainshock, an estimated magnitude 3.1 tremor was recorded at Upal.

=== Aftershocks ===
Severe aftershocks were felt every day up till August 30. There were at least 16 aftershocks with a recorded magnitude of 4.7 or greater from 1902 to 1926—eight were recorded within a month after the mainshock. The first recorded aftershock measuring M_{s} 6.1 occurred at 23:00 on August 22. Several aftershocks registered magnitude 6.0 or greater in the following years. A M_{s} 6.8 or 7.3 aftershock occurred on August 30 with an epicenter 70 km (43 mi) from that of the mainshock. By December 19, eight aftershocks were recorded with M_{s} between 5.7 and 6.4. There were few aftershocks recorded in 1905—possibly because earthquakes during this period went unrecorded. Strong earthquakes continued to rock the mainshock area for years—a M_{s} 5.8 in 1916, M_{s} 6.5 in 1919, and two M_{s} 5.0+ in 1920. The Tien Shan mountains was also the site of earthquakes in December 1906 and January 1911.

== Precursor activity ==
There were unusual noises, peculiar animal behaviors, lights and a change in the weather prior to the mainshock. In Ahu, two hours before the earthquake, cattle, horses, chickens, dogs, cats and other livestock made unusual sounds. In areas which would eventually experience intense (VIII–IX) shaking, animals ran, flew or barked. Loud sounds emitted from the ground and was heard in Maralbexi. The sounds were described as similar to thunder, an airplane or gun blasts. In Artux, it was heard from the west, while at Shule, it was heard from the north. Lights were observed at Jiashi, Shufu, Artux and other places within the meizoseismal area. At Jiashi, these were described as "fire" and "lightning". At Shufu, a meteor-like fireball was observed. The weather was also unusually windy and rainy—there was also hail shortly before the mainshock struck.

== Impact ==
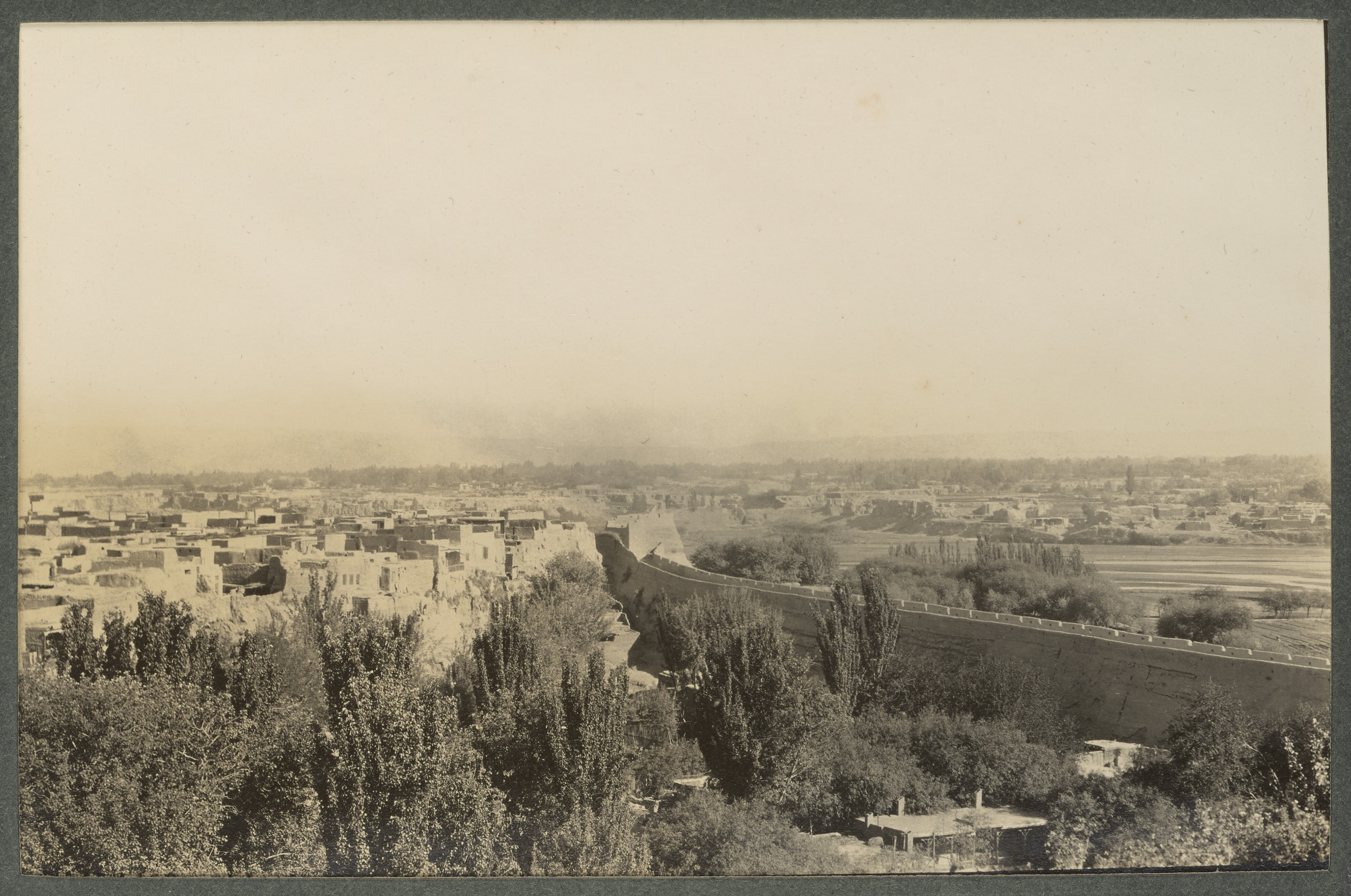
Kashgar photographed in 1915

The earthquake produced strong shaking for 1.5 minutes. Between 5,650 and 10,000 people were killed and more than 30,000 homes collapsed. An additional 600 livestock including sheep, cattle, camels, and donkeys died. In Ahu, all houses with the exception of one located on bedrock collapsed. More than 300 were killed in the township—about 20 percent of its population. The earthquake triggered massive landslides with an estimated volume exceeding 200,000 m^{3} (7,100,000 cu ft).

In the meizoseismal area, trees swayed in a forceful manner such that their tips touched the ground. Some trees were uprooted or snapped. Many tents were affected. Ground slumping near a riverbank blocked roads and dammed streams. Water gushed out from many of the large fissures. The largest fissure measured 1 km (0.62 mi) long, several meters wide, and 3 m (9.8 ft) deep. Five hundred people died in the area. Many domesticated animals were also killed. Old springs dried up while new ones formed.

In Kashgar, sun-dried brick walls and homes collapsed. Masonry buildings did not sustain serious damage. Numerous fissures opened in the northern entrance of the city, where the city walls had toppled. Several historical monuments including the Xiangfei Tomb partially collapsed and fractured. At least 667 people died and thousands more were injured in Kashgar. In Artux, north of Kashgar, the earthquake collapsed nearly every home. Between 5,000 and 6,000 were killed in Artux. The Artux Grand Mosque, the first of its kind in Xinjiang, toppled. Up to half its city walls fell. At least 400 people perished in the village of Astyn, while in Jangi, 20 were killed. In Yarkand, damage was lighter but two children died from toppled walls. Damage was reported in Naryn and At-Bashy but there were no fatalities.

Valleys collapsed and many river channels were blocked, creating waterfalls and new springs. Most earth-constructed homes were destroyed in Songtak, and more than 50 people were killed. At Üstün Atux, 90 percent of its housing stock were destroyed. Several people died in Halajun. Forty deaths were recorded in Upal and the township lost 20 percent of its homes. A death toll exceeding 30 was recorded at Baykurut.

== Aftermath ==
Some villages spent four days burying dead bodies in the wake of the disaster. The Qing dynasty government provided pensions and tax exemptions for the victims. Recorded in Volume 566 of the Qing Shilu (Veritable Records of Qing), the Governor of Gansu and Xinjiang, Rao Yingqi, ordered an investigative committee to evaluate the situation and provide compensation. Guangxu Emperor also issued an edict for tax exemptions.

== See also ==
- List of earthquakes in 1902
- List of earthquakes in China
- List of earthquakes in Kyrgyzstan
