= Terak Township =

Terak 铁列克乡 (Chinese) تېرەك يېزىسى (Uyghur) تەرەك ايىلى (Kyrgyz) Tielieke
- Township
- Location of the township
- Coordinates: 40.0423713776°N 75.7872168915°E
- Country: People's Republic of China
- Autonomous region: Xinjiang
- Prefecture: Kizilsu
- County: Wuqia

Area
  - Total: 1,500 km^{2} (580 sq mi)

Population (2017)
  - Total: 3,788
- Time zone: UTC+8 (China Standard Time)
- Website: www.xjwqx.gov.cn/sitemap.htm

Terak Township (Chinese: 铁列克乡; pinyin: Tiělièkè Xiāng) is a township of Wuqia County in Xinjiang Uygur Autonomous Region, China. Located in the middle northeast of the county, the township covers an area of 1,500 square kilometers with a population of 3,788 (as of 2017). It has 2 administrative villages under its jurisdiction. Its seat is at Ketkara Village (克特喀拉村).

Terak is located 156 kilometers away northeast of the county seat Wuqia Town. It is bordered by Artux City to the southeast, Baykurut Township to the west, Toyun Township in the northwest. It is bordered by the Kyrghyz Republic with a boundary line of 88 kilometers in the north. There are 22 mountain passes and 5 rivers connecting with Kyrgyzstan.

== History ==
"The name "Terak" is from Kyrgyz language, it means "poplar".

Terak was the 4th township of the 4th district in Wuqia County in 1950 and part of Toyun Commune (托云公社) in 1958, it was formed from Toyun Commune in 1962, it was renamed to Xiangyang (向阳公社) from Terak in 1968 and restored the original name in 1980 and organized as a township in 1984.

== Brief Introduction ==
The township of Terak has an area of about 1,500 square kilometers with 1,030 households and a population of 3,788 (as of 2017). Its highest altitude in the territory is 4,024 meters and the lowest altitude is 2,346 meters. The township has highways to the cities of Artux and Kashi.

The economy of Terak is mainly based on animal husbandry, the agronomic crops are winter wheat, highland barley and medicago, limestone is its mineral product. The township has a cultivated land of 175.3 hectares, artificial herbage Land of 273.5 hectares and the forest land of 60 hectares.

== Settlements ==
The township has 2 administration villages and 5 unincorporated villages under its jurisdiction.

2 administration villages:

- Qaraterek Village (哈拉铁克村, قاراتېرەك كەنتى, قاراتەرەك قىشتاعى)
- Terek Village (铁列克村, تېرەك كەنتى, تەرەك قىشتاعى)
