= Torugart Pass =

Pass in the Tian Shan mountain range

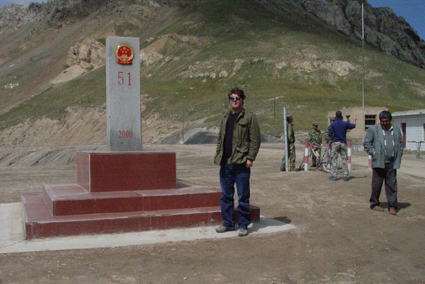
- The Chinese border crossing at the Torugart Pass on the road between Naryn (Kyrgyzstan) and Kashgar (Xinjiang)

- Location within Southern Xinjiang Location within Kyrgyzstan
- Interactive map of Torugart Pass
- Elevation: 3,752 metres (12,310 ft)
- Traversed by: G315 – ЭМ-11 ЭМ-11 (E125)

Third Approach
- Location: China–Kyrgyzstan border
- Range: Tian Shan
- Coordinates: 40.583333333333°N 75.416666666667°E

Torugart Pass

Chinese name
- Traditional Chinese: 吐爾尕特山口
- Simplified Chinese: 吐尔尕特山口
Transcriptions
Standard Mandarin
- Hanyu Pinyin: Tǔ'ěrgǎtè shānkǒu

Alternative Chinese name
- Traditional Chinese: 圖嚕噶爾特山口
- Simplified Chinese: 图噜噶尔特山口
Transcriptions
Standard Mandarin
- Hanyu Pinyin: Túlūgá'ĕrtè shānkŏu

Uyghur name
- Uyghur: تورغات ئېغىزى
Transcriptions
- Latin Yëziqi: Torghat éghizi
- Siril Yëziqi: Торғат еғизи

Kyrgyz name
- Kyrgyz: تورۇعارت اشۇۇسۇ; Торугарт ашуусу Torugart ashuusu

Russian name
- Russian: Перевал Торугарт

Torugart Pass (Uyghur: تورغات ئېغىزى, romanized: Torghat ëghizi; Kyrgyz: تورۇعارت اشۇۇسۇ, romanized: Torughart ashuusu; Chinese: 吐尔尕特山口; Russian: Перевал Торугарт) is a mountain pass in the Tian Shan mountain range near the border between the Naryn Region of Kyrgyzstan and the Xinjiang Autonomous Region of China. It is one of two border crossings between Kyrgyzstan and China, the other being Erkeshtam, some 165 km (103 mi) to the southwest.

The scenic lake Chatyr-Köl lies near the pass on the Kyrgyz side. The road to Naryn and then to Balykchy and Bishkek—stretching for some 400 km (250 mi)—is narrow and in winter often impassable due to heavy snowfall and frequent avalanches. On the Chinese side, the Torugart Port of Entry (吐尔尕特口岸), where travelers must clear for customs, is located about 110 km (68 mi) from the pass itself in Ulugqat County of the Kizilsu Kirghiz Autonomous Prefecture. Distances from the pass to major cities are: 110 km (68 mi) to Ulugqat, 165 km (103 mi) to Kashgar, 170 kilometres (110 mi) to Artux and some 1,630 km (1,010 mi) to Ürümqi.

The pass is also terminus of European route E125 and, under the new National Highway plans, the China National Highway 315, but neither are signed in this area by 2020.

== History ==
The pass has been used since antiquity. During the Han dynasty it was under the jurisdiction of a micro-state called Juandu (捐毒国). During the Tang dynasty, the region came under Tang control as part of Anxi Protectorate.

Russia and China first established a port of entry at the Torugart Pass in 1881. In 1906, Russia's Sino-Russian Transport Bank financed the construction of the road from the pass to Kashgar for 20 million rubles. In 1952, the Torugart Pass replaced the Irkeshtam Pass, which lies some 165 km (103 mi) southwest, as the primary overland link between Xinjiang and the then-Soviet Kyrgyz Republic. The pass was closed in 1969 due to the Sino-Soviet Split and reopened again in 1983. In 1995, the Torugart Port of Entry was relocated to a lower elevation (2,000m), closer to Kashgar, some 57 km (35 mi) away.

The pass is open to all nationalities but clearance requires careful arrangement of transportation.

=== Planned railway ===
A China–Kyrgyzstan–Uzbekistan railway going through Torugart Pass has been in the works that would connect Kashgar and the Ferghana Valley since 2012. The railway would lead from Kashgar to Jalal-Abad and further on to the Uzbek city of Andijan. However, the Kyrgyz section of the rail has been stalled due to financial and technical issues and possibly due to Russian and Kazakh opposition to the project. In 2023, the project development received new push from the governments of the three countries involved. A tripartite agreement was signed on 17 September 2022 during the Shanghai Cooperation Organization summit, although funding was yet to be secured at the time. An inaugural ceremony was held in Jalal-Abad in December 2024 and construction is set to begin in July 2025.

== Gallery ==
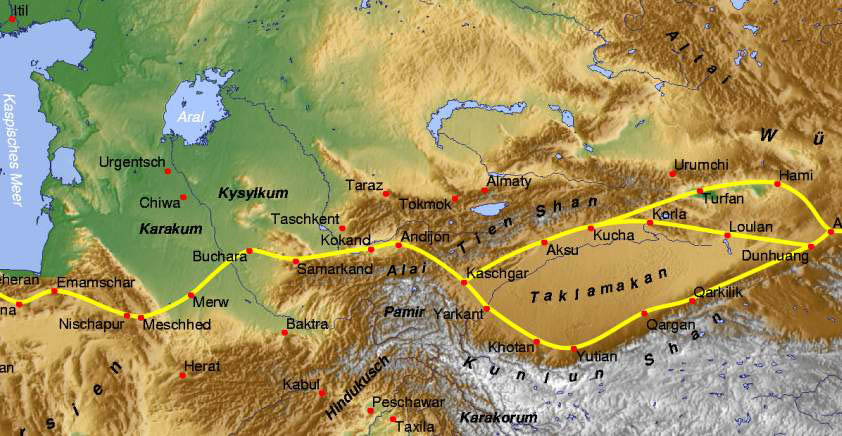
The ancient silk road showing the general location of the pass

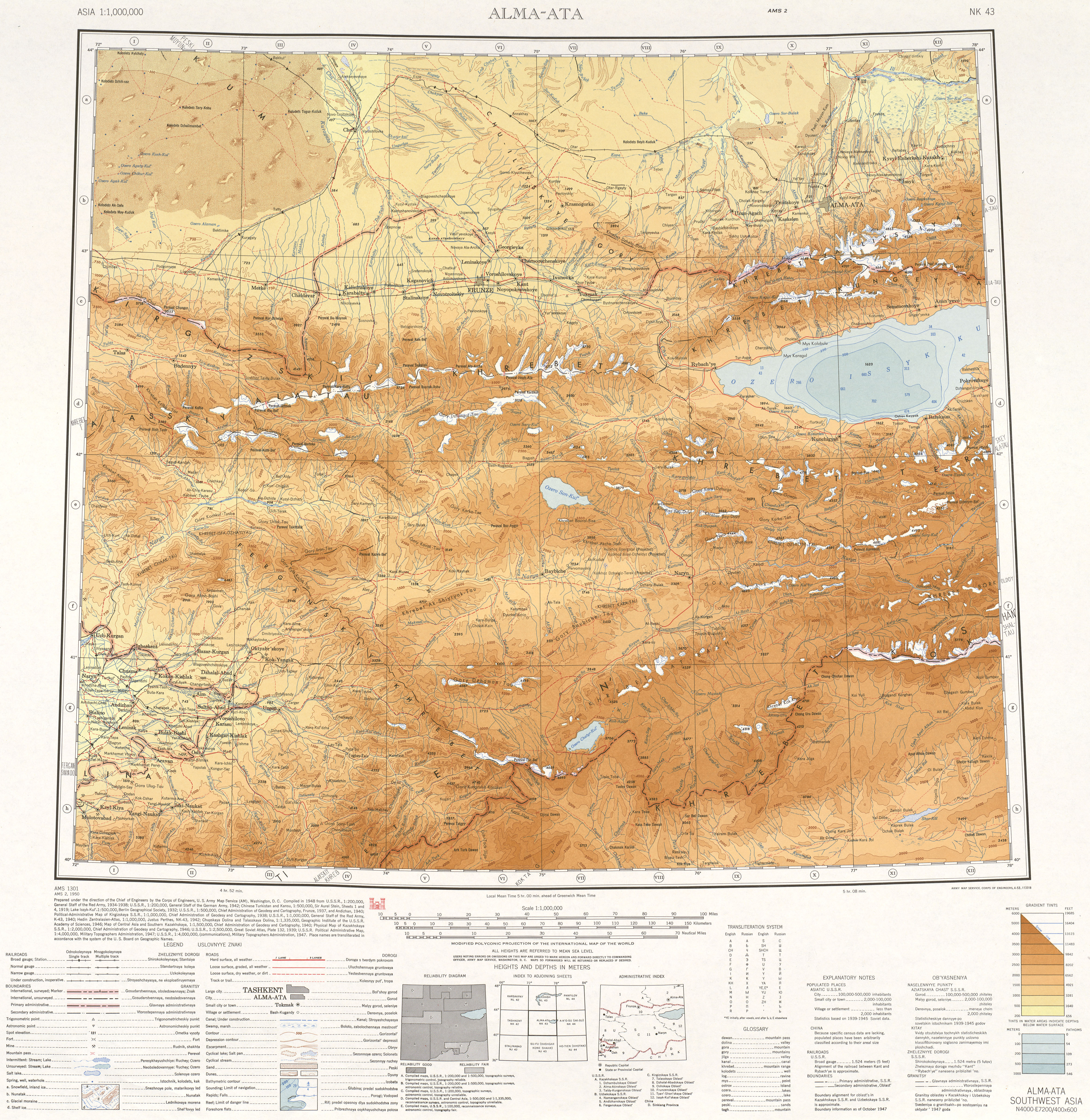
Map of the region including the Torugart Pass (unlabelled; roads can be seen) (AMS, 1948)

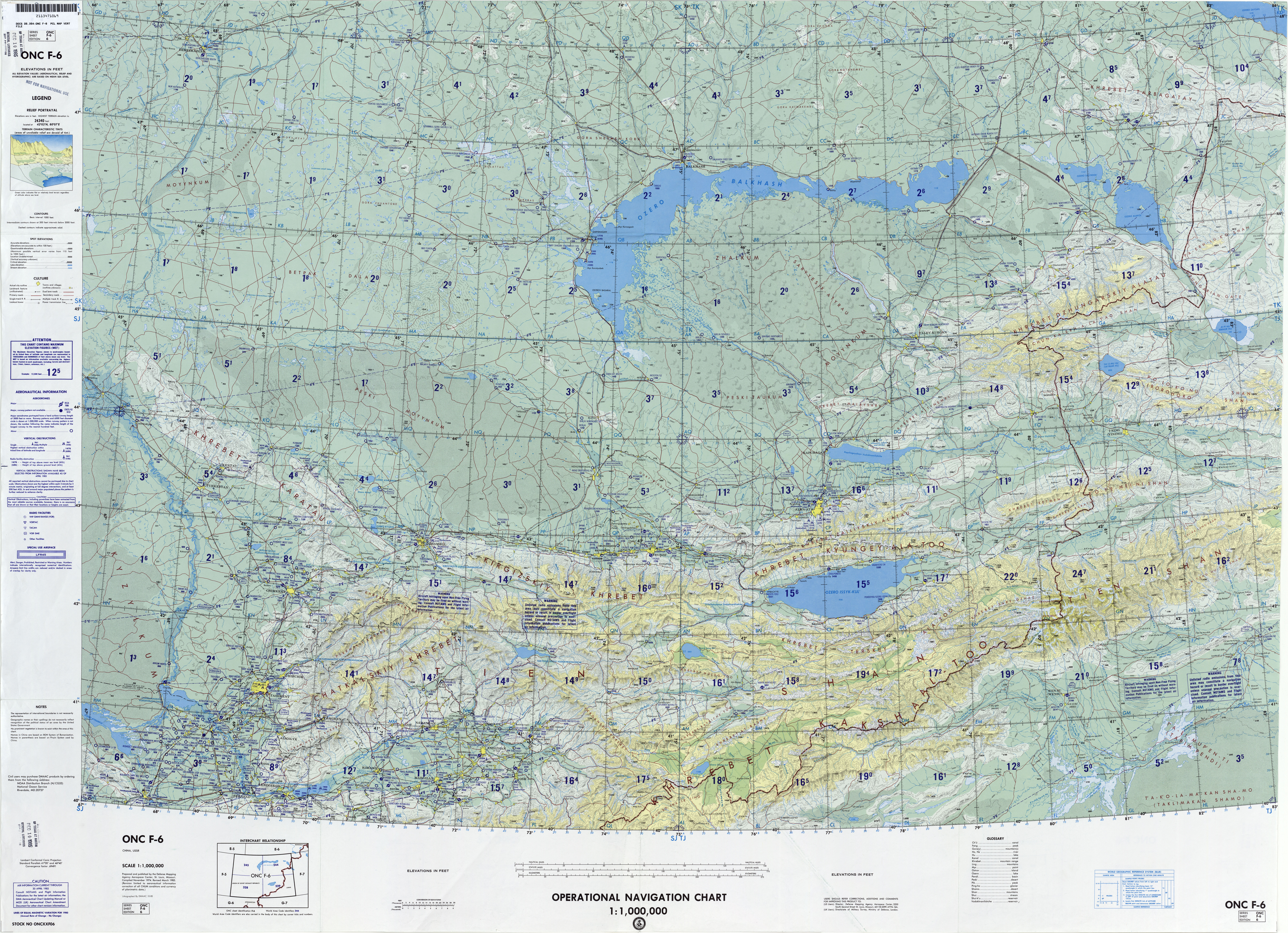
Map of the region including the Torugart Pass (unlabelled; roads can be seen) (DMA, 1985)

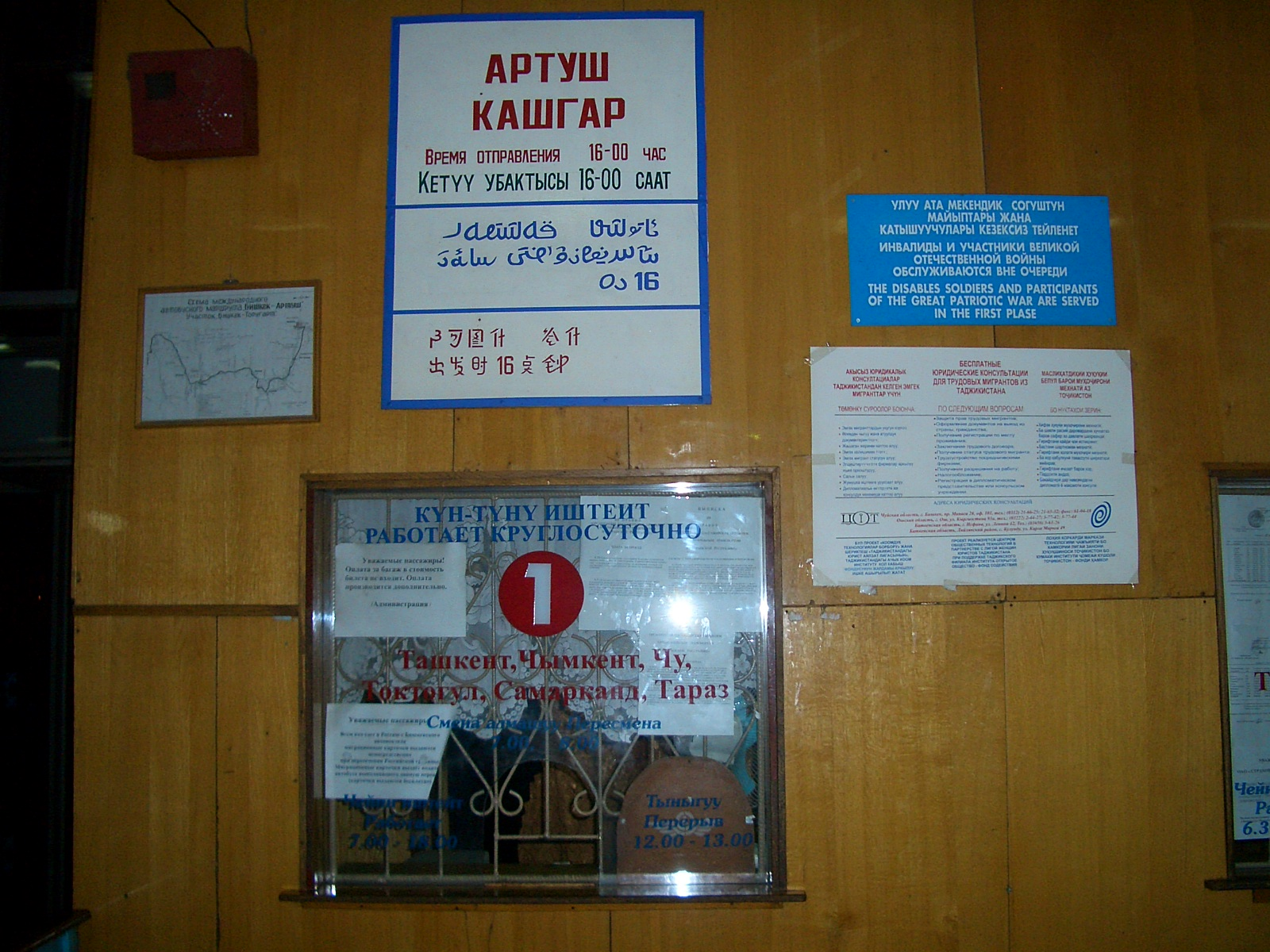
A ticket office at Bishkek's West Bus Terminal informs passengers about the schedule and route of the Bishkek-Artush-Kashgar bus traveling via Torugart Pass

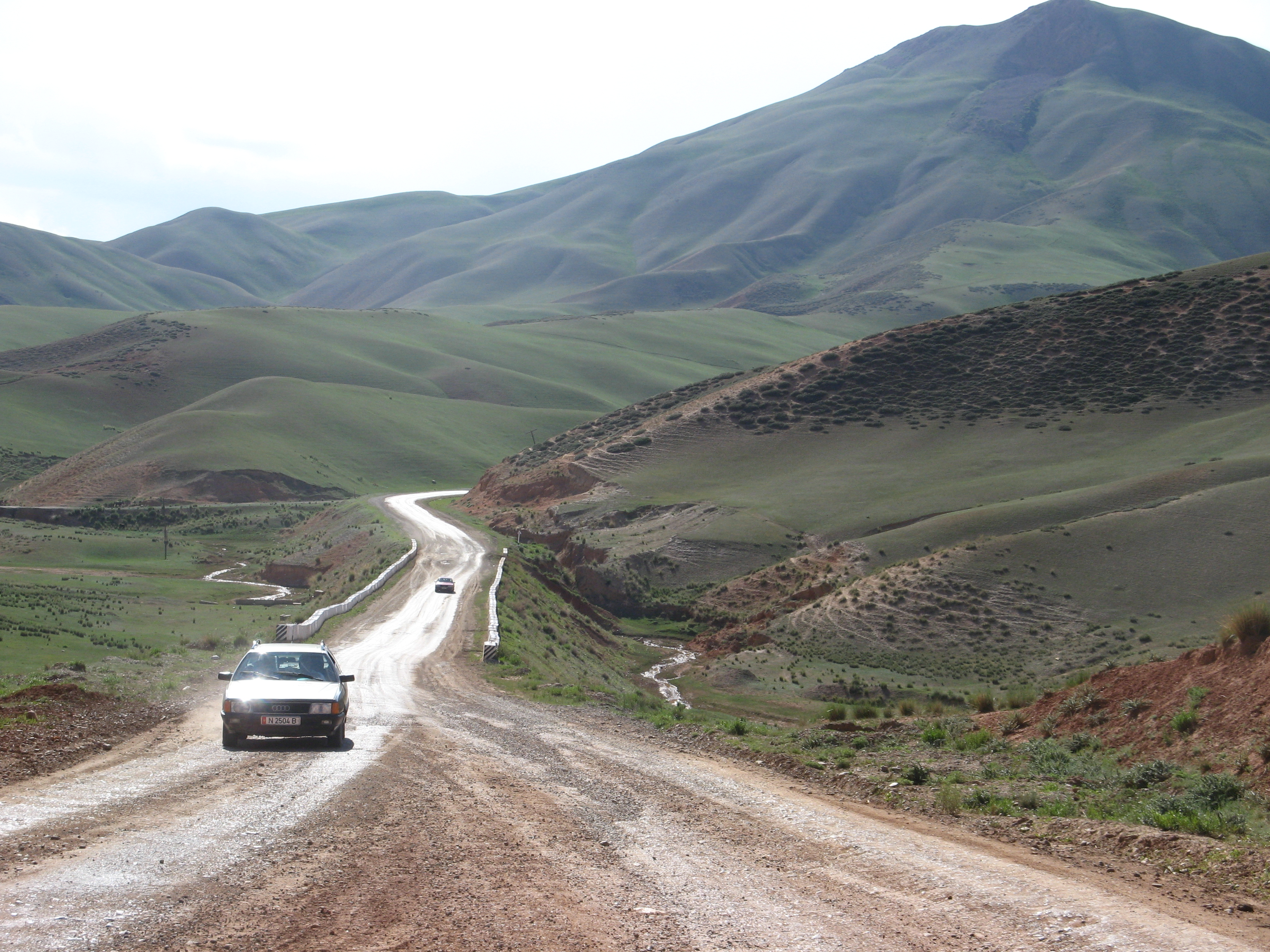

== Climate ==
Climate data for Torugart Pass, elevation 3,504 m (11,496 ft), (1991–2020 normals)
Month	Jan	Feb	Mar	Apr	May	Jun	Jul	Aug	Sep	Oct	Nov	Dec	Year
Mean daily maximum °C (°F)	−8.1 (17.4)	−6.2 (20.8)	−1.7 (28.9)	3.6 (38.5)	7.7 (45.9)	11.4 (52.5)	14.4 (57.9)	13.8 (56.8)	9.9 (49.8)	3.2 (37.8)	−1.9 (28.6)	−6.2 (20.8)	3.3 (38.0)
Daily mean °C (°F)	−14.6 (5.7)	−12.7 (9.1)	−7.6 (18.3)	−1.8 (28.8)	2.1 (35.8)	5.5 (41.9)	8.1 (46.6)	7.6 (45.7)	3.8 (38.8)	−2.7 (27.1)	−8.1 (17.4)	−12.9 (8.8)	−2.8 (27.0)
Mean daily minimum °C (°F)	−20.4 (−4.7)	−18.9 (−2.0)	−13.3 (8.1)	−6.4 (20.5)	−2.3 (27.9)	0.6 (33.1)	2.5 (36.5)	2.0 (35.6)	−1.6 (29.1)	−7.6 (18.3)	−13.4 (7.9)	−18.3 (−0.9)	−8.1 (17.5)
Average precipitation mm (inches)	3.2 (0.13)	4.7 (0.19)	17.7 (0.70)	26.6 (1.05)	44.2 (1.74)	50.2 (1.98)	43.6 (1.72)	45.6 (1.80)	26.8 (1.06)	21.1 (0.83)	8.8 (0.35)	6.2 (0.24)	298.7 (11.79)
Average precipitation days (≥ 0.1 mm)	4.5	6.8	10.2	11.6	14.8	15.8	13.6	13.3	9.8	9.4	6.4	5.1	121.3
Average snowy days	10.7	13.3	16.7	16.7	19.8	15.3	8.4	8.6	13.2	15.0	11.6	10.7	160
Average relative humidity (%)	57	59	60	59	60	59	55	56	57	61	57	58	58
Mean monthly sunshine hours	217.1	207.7	243.6	259.2	272.8	276.5	302.1	278.9	255.2	245.4	221.2	207.6	2,987.3
Percentage possible sunshine	72	68	65	64	61	62	67	67	70	73	76	72	68
Source: China Meteorological Administration

== See also ==
- China–Kyrgyzstan border
- Geography of China
- Geography of Kyrgyzstan
- Geostrategy in Central Asia
- Baykurut
