= Toyun =

Township of Wuqia County, Xinjiang, China

Toyun 托云乡 (Chinese) تويۇن يېزىسى (Uyghur) تويۇن ايىلى (Kyrgyz) Tuoyun
- Township
- Location of the township
- Coordinates: 40.1646175734°N 75.3287169617°E
- Country: People's Republic of China
- Autonomous region: Xinjiang
- Prefecture: Kizilsu
- County: Wuqia

Area
  - Total: 1,546 km^{2} (597 sq mi)

Population (2017)
  - Total: 2,651
- Time zone: UTC+8 (China Standard Time)
- Website: www.xjwqx.gov.cn/sitemap.htm

Toyun Township (Chinese: 托云乡; pinyin: Tuōyún Xiāng) is a township of Wuqia County in Xinjiang Uygur Autonomous Region, China. Located in the northeast of the county, the township covers an area of l,546 square kilometers with a population of 2,651 (as of 2017). It has 3 administrative villages under its jurisdiction. Its seat is at Kaklik (盖克力克).

Toyun is located 103 kilometers away northeast of the county seat Wuqia Town. It is bordered by Ulugqat and Kiziloy townships to the southwest, Baykurut and Terak townships to the southeast. It is bordered by the Kyrghyz Republic with a boundary line of 115 kilometers to the northeast and west. There are 27 mountain passes connecting with Kyrgyzstan. The Turugart Port (吐尔尕特口岸) to Bishkek, the capital of Kyrgyzstan, is in the township and it is a national first-class port.

== History ==
"The name "Toyun" is from Kyrgyz language, it means "a place to eat full stomach" (吃饱肚子的地方) or "a rich land" (富裕之地). The land is wide and the water and grass are abundant there, it was named after that.

Toyun was part of the 4th district in Wuqia County in 1950 and Toyun Commune (托云公社) was formed in 1958, it was renamed to Zhongdong (忠东公社) and restored the original name in 1980, and organized as a township in 1984.

== Geography ==
The seat of Tuoyun Township is at 2,780 meters above sea level. The average elevation of the township is above 3,300 meters. The highest altitude is 5,031 meters. The altitude of each pasture is 3,000-4,500 meters. More than 98% are Gobi desert and saline-alkali land, and the climate is extremely bad. The winter is cold and long, the annual heating time is more than 7 months, the lowest temperature in winter is as low as minus 30 degree Celsius, the summer is cool and short, the highest temperature is about 25 degree Celsius, it is windy, the mountain flood disaster occurs frequently, the annual average temperature Less than 6 degree Celsius.

== Settlements ==
The township has 3 administration villages and 5 unincorporated villages under its jurisdiction.

3 administration villages:

- Quwwat Village (库瓦特村, قۇۋۋەت كەنتى, قۇبات قىشتاعى)
- Suuk Village (苏约克村, سۆڭەك كەنتى, سۅۅك قىشتاعى)
- Toyun Village (托云村, تويۇن كەنتى, تويۇن قىشتاعى)

settlements:

- Kaklik (盖克力克)
- Tamqi
