= Toyun Ranch =

Toyun Ranch 托云牧场 Tuoyun Ranch
- military reclamation farm
- Location of the farm
- Coordinates: 39.8190619056°N 75.602176339°E
- Country: People's Republic of China
- Autonomous region: Xinjiang
- XPCC: 3rd Division
- County: Wuqia

Area
  - Total: 493.3 km^{2} (190.5 sq mi)

Population (2017)
  - Total: 1,007
- Time zone: UTC+8 (China Standard Time)
- Website: sstymc.xjbtnss.gov.cn/tuanchanggaikuang/

Toyun Ranch (also as Tuoyun Ranch; Chinese: 托云牧场; pinyin: Tuōyún Mùchǎng) is a ranch located along China–Kyrgyzstan border in Wuqia County, Xinjiang Uygur Autonomous Region, China, it is operated and managed by the 3rd Division of Xinjiang Production and Construction Corps. Its geographical coordinates are 74°50 ́ ́- 67°10 ́, north latitude 39°45 ́ - 40°40´, the altitude 2,147-4,391 meters. Its headquarters is located at Kizilmoynok (克孜勒莫伊若克), 60 km from Kashgar and 115 km from the Turugart Port. Turugart - Kashi Highway passes through the field.

Tuoyun Ranch has a land area of 522 square kilometers, including 20 hectares of arable land and 440 square kilometers of natural grassland. As of 2017, the total population is 1,007, with the ethnic minorities of 898 population accounting for 89.2% of the total. There are 3 animal husbandry companies, a school, a health center and a community service center. Tuoyun Ranch is mainly engaged in raising sheep, its industrial structure is single. It belongs to alpine mountainous areas with poor natural conditions, bad weather and frequent natural disasters. Because of that, the development of its economy is slow.

== History ==
The predecessor of Toyun Ranch was formed by the merger of the four army sheep farms of Toyun (托云羊场), Moji (木吉羊场), Ying'er (英尔羊场)and Aying (阿英羊场), and the ranch of the 13th Division Of the National Army (民族军13师牧场) in January 1951. It was transferred to the Production Management Office of the South Xinjiang Military Region (南疆军区生产管理处) in March 1953, and named the 3rd Ranch of the Production Management Office (南管处第三牧场). The Production and Management Office was incorporated into the 1st Agriculture Construction Division in April 1955, it was named the 3rd Ranch of the 1st Agriculture Construction Division (农一师第三牧场). In January 1959, the ranch was merged to Qianjin General Farm (前进总场), named the 3rd Ranch of Qianjin General Farm (前进第三牧场). In September 1962, the 1st Agriculture Construction Division took back the direct leadership and restored the name of the 3rd Ranch of the 1st Agriculture Construction Division (农一师第三牧场). In September 1962, the 2nd Ranch of the 1st Agriculture Construction Division in Yecheng was transferred to the 3rd Agriculture Construction Division, the 3rd Ranch was replenished as the 2nd Tongyun Ranch of the 1st Agriculture Construction Division (农一师托云二牧场). With the abolition of the Xinjiang Production and Construction Corps in 1975, the 2nd Toyun Ranch was transferred to Kizilsu Prefecture and named the Ranch of Kizilsu Prefecture (克州牧场), and it was renamed Ranch of Wuqia County (乌恰县牧场) in January 1977. In May 1982, it was transferred to the leadership of Kizilsu Prefecture Bureau of Farms and Land Reclamation, and renamed to the 2nd Toyun Ranch of Kizilsu Prefecture (克州托云二牧场). In April 1982, the 3rd Agriculture Construction Division was restored, and in April 1984, the 2nd Toyun Ranch was transferred to the 3rd Division, it was renamed Toyun Ranch of the 3rd Division (农三师托云牧场).

In 2006, Toyun Ranch was combined to the Jiashi General Farm by trusteeship, with the Jiashi General Farm as the center, two CPC party committees, two sets of leading bodies and two agencies' leadership and management systems. In February 2010, Toyun Ranch was restored as a separate unit of the 3rd Division of the XPCC.

== Health care ==
Toyun Ranch has a health center, 3 company clinics with A total of 12 hospital beds and 16 medical staff. In 2017, outpatient treatment was more than 1,264 people, outpatient visited 4,260 people. A health profile for people with hypertension, diabetes and infectious diseases was established, and 226 married women of childbearing age were surveyed free of charge in the year.

== Education ==
The ranch has a school for primary and secondary education, and a kindergarten. As of 2017, there were 7 full-time teachers with 46 students of secondary education, 19 full-time teachers with 123 students of primary education. The admission rate of baby children reached 100%, and the enrollment rate of primary and secondary school-age children were all 100%.
