= Kangsu Town =

Kangsu Town 康苏镇 (Chinese) كانسۇ بازىرى (Uyghur) كەنسۇۇ شاارچاسى (Kyrgyz)
- Town
- Location of the town
- Coordinates: 39.7263065362°N 75.0291286592°E
- Country: People's Republic of China
- Autonomous region: Xinjiang
- Prefecture: Kizilsu
- County: Wuqia

Area
  - Total: 22 km^{2} (8.5 sq mi)

Population (2017)
  - Total: 5,831
- Time zone: UTC+8 (China Standard Time)
- Website: www.xjwqx.gov.cn/sitemap.htm

Kangsu Town (simplified Chinese: 康苏镇; traditional Chinese: 康蘇鎮; pinyin: Kāngsū Zhèn) is a town of Wuqia County in Xinjiang Uygur Autonomous Region, China. Located in the middle of the county, 23 km away west of Wuqia Town. The town covers an area of 22 square kilometers with a population of 5,831 (as of 2017) and 4 communities under itsjurisdiction. The town of Kangsu is the main industrial mining area in Kizilsu Prefecture, mainly coal mining, cement, power generation, mining machinery and building materials.

== History ==
Kangsu Town was first established in May 1958, and the Kangsu Mining Area (康苏矿区) was established after the town's amalgamating to Kangsu Iron and Steel Plant (康苏钢铁厂) in the next year. The town was restored from the Kangsu Mining Area in October 1984. Kangsu Town is located along the main road of transportation with a history of more than 2,000 years, it has been an important transit point for the "Silk Road Economic Belt" since ancient times. In the 1960s and 1970s, There were three state-owned enterprises of Qianjin Coal Mine (前进煤矿), Kangsu Cement Plant (康苏水泥厂) and Kangsu Thermal Power Plant (康苏火电厂) with more than 20,000 workers of various types participated in the construction. Kangsu became a veritable industrial town in southern Xinjiang and played an important role in the history of Xinjiang's industry.

== Infrastructure and economy ==
With the restructuring of state-owned enterprises, the four state-owned enterprises of Kangsu Coal Mine, Kangsu Cement Plant, Kangsu Thermal Power Plant and Kalajiligang Coal Mine stopped production and went bankrupt in 2000. With the opportunity of the Western Development, Kangsu becomes a heavy industrial park to develop new industrialization in Wuqia County, and a number of resource development enterprises such as Hongze Mining and Jiaxing Cast Iron Casting Co., Ltd. entered the industrial park, and the 110 kV substation was built in Kangsu. The G3013 Kashgar–Erkeshtam Expressway traverses the territory.

In recent years, around the construction of China's most western border town with "unified planning, rational layout, facilities, and safety and application", Kangsu has changed rapidly and the new urbanization process has accelerated. Kangsu Town was listed as the first batch of county-level reform pilot town in Wuqia County on November 5, 2008. In May 2015, the town was identified as one of the second batch of pilot towns for independent industrial and mining areas in China. In June 2015, Kangsu was identified by the autonomous region as one of the second batch of pilot projects for the transformation of independent industrial and mining areas in China. The entire project has been transformed into a total of 30 projects in four major categories, including infrastructure, public service facilities, safe-haven resettlement, and continuous replacement industry development, with a total investment of CNY498 million.

== Residential communities ==
The town has 4 residential communities under its jurisdiction.

4 residential communities:

- Qaba Community (哈巴社区, قابا مەھەللىسى, قابا قوومدۇق قونۇشۇ)
- Yengijay Community (英加依社区, يېڭى جاي مەھەللىسى, جاڭى جاي قوومدۇق قونۇشۇ)
- Coal Mine Community (煤矿社区, كۆمۈركان مەھەللىسى, كۅمۉركەن قوومدۇق قونۇشۇ)
- Birleshme Community (比尔列西米社区, بىرلەشمە مەھەللىسى, بئرلەشمە قوومدۇق قونۇشۇ)
