= Kiziloy =

Kiziloy 黑孜苇乡 (Chinese) قىزىلئۆي يېزىسى (Uyghur) قىزىلۉي ايىلى (Kyrgyz) Heiziwei
- Township
- Location of the township
- Coordinates: 39.7073497883°N 75.2145409713°E
- Country: People's Republic of China
- Autonomous region: Xinjiang
- Prefecture: Kizilsu
- County: Wuqia

Area
  - Total: 2,782 km^{2} (1,074 sq mi)
- Elevation: 3,000 m (9,800 ft)

Population (2017)
  - Total: 6,899
- Time zone: UTC+8 (China Standard Time)
- Website: www.xjwqx.gov.cn/sitemap.htm

Kiziloy Township (قىزىلئۆي يېزىسى / Heiziwei Chinese: 黑孜苇乡; pinyin: Hēizīwěi Xiāng) is the former county seat before 1989 and a township of Wuqia County in Xinjiang Uygur Autonomous Region, China. Located in the middle of the county, the township covers an area of 2,782.4 square kilometers with a population of 6,899 (as of 2017). It has 6 administrative villages under its jurisdiction. Its seat is at Kiziloy (黑孜苇).

Kiziloy is located 5 kilometers away southwest of the county seat Wuqia Town. It is adjacent to Baykurut Township in the east, Shufu County in the south, Toyun Township in the northeast and Ulugqat Township in the northwest.

== Name ==
The name Kiziloy is from the Kyrgyz language and means "red depression" or "basin", where 'kizil' ('heizi') means 'red' and 'oy' ('wei') means 'depression' or 'basin'. Other nearby places with the word 'kizil' (red) in their names include Kizilsu, Kizil Caves, and Kizilto.

On a Qing Dynasty map of Shufu County, the Kiziloy area is labeled Hezi'ayi (黑子阿依).

== History ==
Kiziloy was part of the 1st district in Wuqia County in 1950 and Kiziloy Commune (黑孜苇公社) was formed in 1958, it was renamed Dongfanghong Commune (东方红公社) in 1968 and restored the original name in 1980, and organized as a township in 1984.

== Overview ==
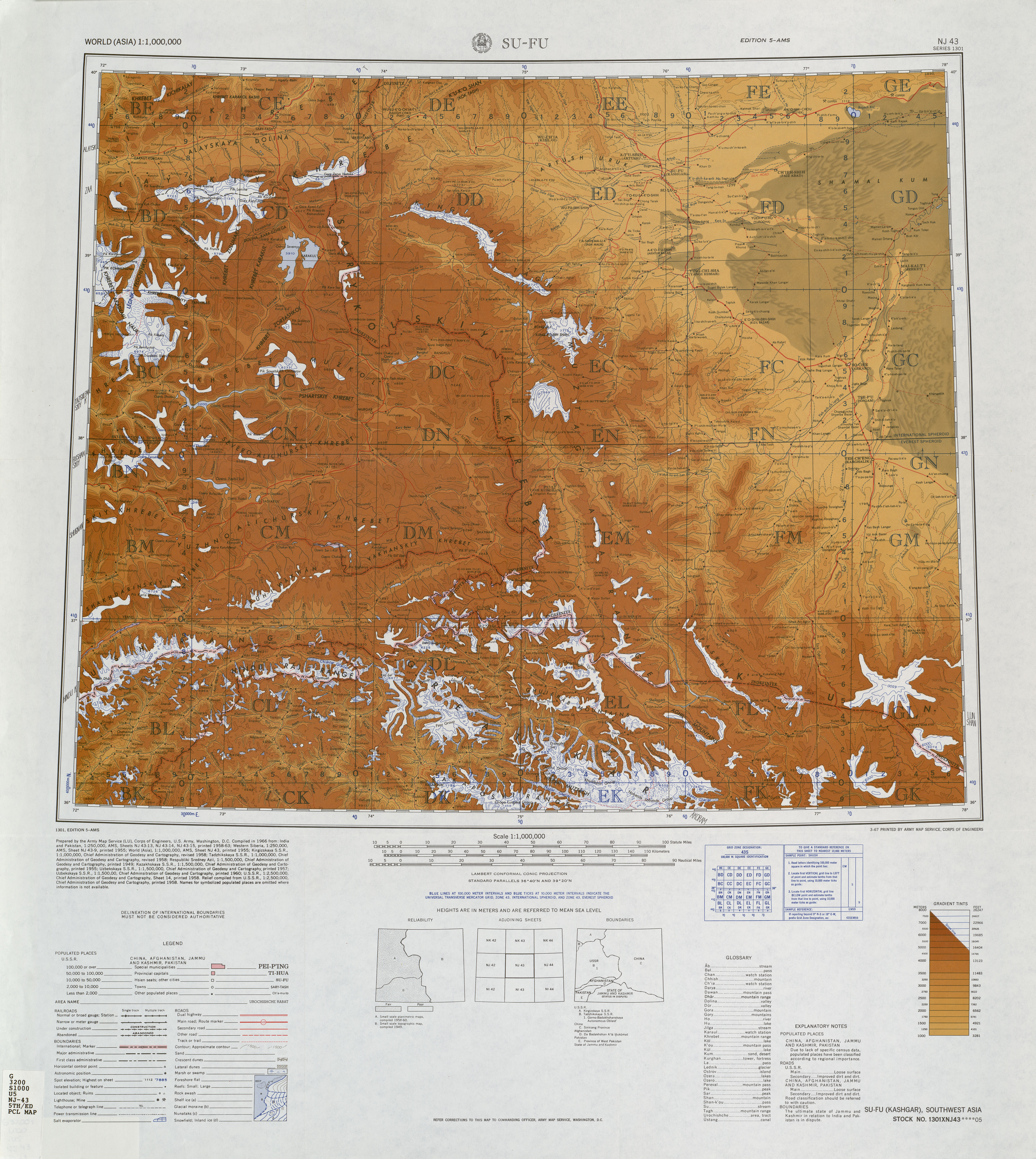
Map including Kiziloy (labeled as WU-CH'IA (KIZIL OI)) and surrounding region from the International Map of the World (1966) (Note: From map: "DELINEATION OF INTERNATIONAL BOUNDARIES MUST NOT BE CONSIDERED AUTHORITATIVE")

The township's seat is at 2,500 meters above sea level. The average elevation of the township is above 3,000 meters. The highest altitude is 4,000 meters. The altitude of each pasture point is 3000–4000 meters. More than 98% are Gobi desert and saline-alkali land. The local climate is extremely harsh, the winter is cold and long, the heating time is up to 6 months per year, and the lowest temperature in winter is as low as minus 6 degrees Celsius. The summer is cool and short, the highest temperature is about 25 degrees, there are many windy weather, frequent mountain flood disasters, and the annual average temperature is less than 6 °C. The terrain is cut in depth, the north is high and south low.

The width of east and west is 78 kilometers, and the north and south are 86 kilometers long. The total area of the township is 2,782.4 square kilometers, of which the grassland area is 1,693 square kilometers, the forest area is 120.13 hectares, and the cultivated area is 625.13 hectares. There are 6 villages and 25 village groups. There are a total of 2,604 households with a population of 6,899, of which, Kyrgyz of 5,201, Han of 1,067, Uyghur peoples of 5,90 and the other ethnic groups of 41.

== Settlements ==
The township has a residential community, 6 administration villages and 16 unincorporated villages under its jurisdiction.

1 community:

- Aybulaq Community (Ayibulakeshequn) (阿依布拉克社区, ئايبۇلاق مەھەللىسى, ايبۇلاق قوومدۇق قونۇشۇ)

6 administration villages:

- Arabulaq Village (Arebulakecun) (阿热布拉克村, ئارابۇلاق كەنتى, ارابۇلاق قىشتاعى)
- Ikkiterek Village (Yeketierekecun) (也克铁热克村, ئىككىتېرەك كەنتى, ەكىتەرەك قىشتاعى)
  - 39°42′58″N 075°13′07″E
- Janjir Village (Jiangji'ercun) (江吉尔村, جانجىر كەنتى, جانجىر قىشتاعى)
- Kengshiwer Village (Kangshiwei'ercun) (康什维尔村, كەڭشىۋەر كەنتى, كەڭشۇەر قىشتاعى)
  - 39°40′43″N 075°22′05″E
- Kol'eriq Village (Kule'arikecun) (库勒阿日克村, كۆلئېرىق كەنتى, كۅلارىق قىشتاعى)
- Qanjughan Village (Kanjiugancun) (坎久干村, غانجۇغان كەنتى, عانجۇعان قىشتاعى)
  - 39°42′07″N 075°14′25″E

== Demographics ==
Historical population
Year	Pop.	±% p.a.
2000	5,837	—
2010	5,405	−0.77%

As of 1997, the population of Kiziloy was 72.4% Kyrgyz. The Heiziwei subgroup of Kyrgyz people speak the Heiziwei dialect of Northern Kyrgyz.

== Economy ==
Economic activities in Kiziloy include flour processing and other small scale industries as well as mining of celestine, gypsum, red clay, lead and zinc. Groundwater resources are abundant.

== Transportation ==
- G3013 Kashgar–Erkeshtam Expressway
