= Baykurut =

Baykurut 巴音库鲁提镇 (Chinese) بايقۇرۇت بازىرى (Uyghur) بايقۇرۇت شاارچاسى (Kyrgyz) Bayqurut, Bayinkuluti
- Town
- Location of the town
- Coordinates: 39.9452498225°N 75.5486637353°E
- Country: People's Republic of China
- Autonomous region: Xinjiang
- Prefecture: Kizilsu
- County: Wuqia

Area
  - Total: 1,317 km^{2} (508 sq mi)

Population (2010)
  - Total: 2,225

Ethnic groups
  - Major ethnic groups: Kyrgyz
- Time zone: UTC+8 (China Standard Time)
- Website: www.xjwqx.gov.cn/sitemap.htm

Baykurut Town also Baykurt (بايقۇرۇت يېزىسى / Байқурут / Bayinkuluti simplified Chinese: 巴音库鲁提乡; traditional Chinese: 巴音庫魯提鄉; pinyin: Bāyīnkùlǔtí Xiāng) is a town of Wuqia County in Kizilsu Kyrgyz Autonomous Prefecture, Xinjiang Uygur Autonomous Region, China. Baykurut is located in the central to eastern part of the county. It has 2 administrative villages under its jurisdiction. Its seat is at Baykurut Village (巴音库鲁提村).

Baykurut is located 65 km (40 mi) away northeast of the county seat Wuqia Town and 23 km (14 mi) south of Turugart Port (托帕口岸). It is adjacent to Terak Township in the east, Artux City and Wuqia Town in the south, Toyun Township in the north. It is bordered by the Kyrghyz Republic with a boundary line of 40 kilometers in the west.

== Name ==
The name Baykurut is derived from the Kyrgyz language. Baykurut was named after Kurut (قۇرۇت / Kuluti, 库鲁提), a rich person who lived in the Baykurut area.

== History ==
Baykurut was the 3rd township of the 4th district in Wuqia County in 1950 and part of Toyun Commune (托云公社) in 1958, Baykurut Commune was formed from Toyun in 1962.

In 1968 during the Cultural Revolution, the commune was renamed Hongqi Commune (literally 'Red flag commune', 红旗公社). The original name was restored in 1980.

In 1984, organized as a township in 1984.

In 2020, on December 30, the township was upgraded to a town status.

== Geography ==
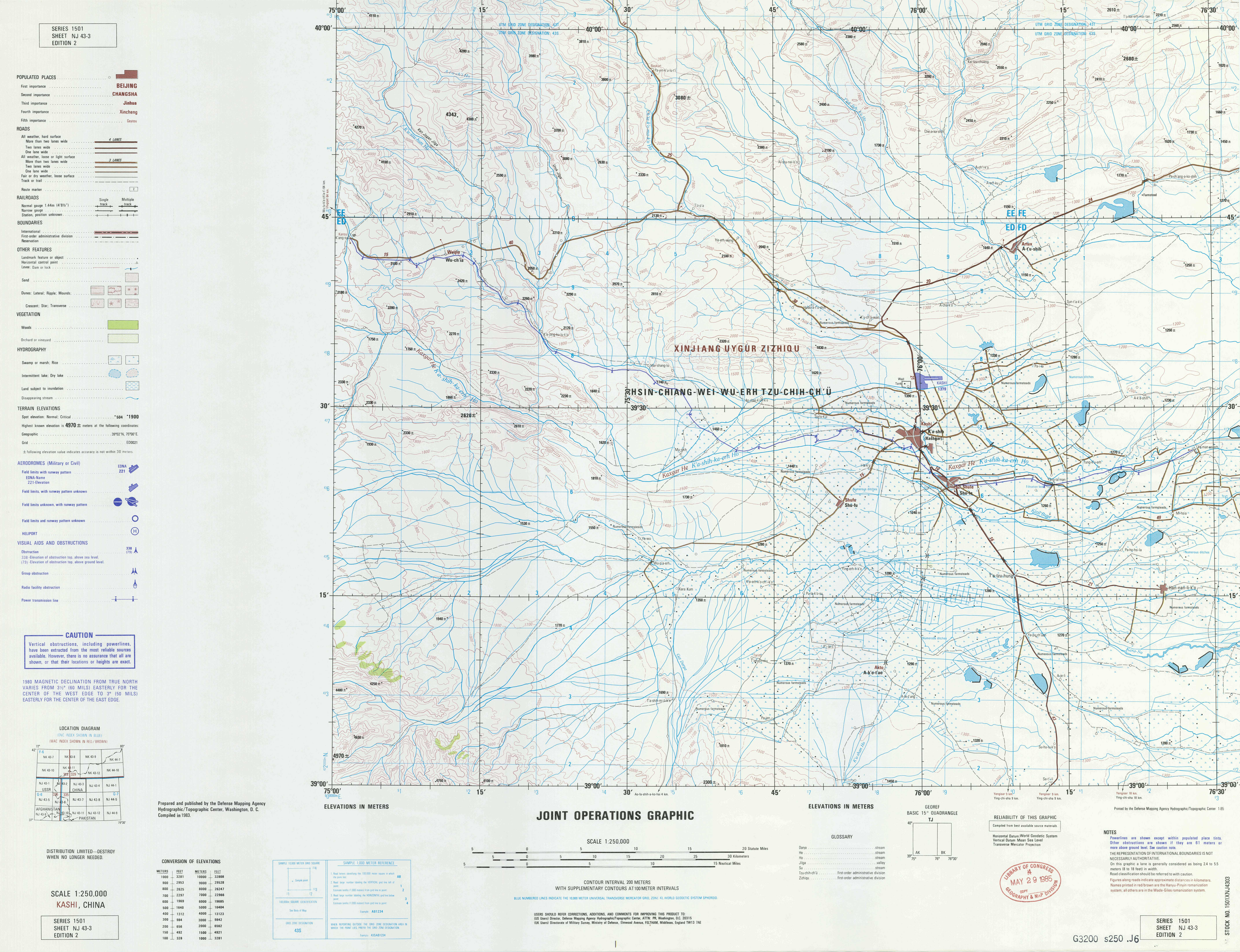
Map of the Kashgar area including Baykurut (labeled as Baykurt Pa-yin-k'u-lu-t'i) (DMA, 1983)

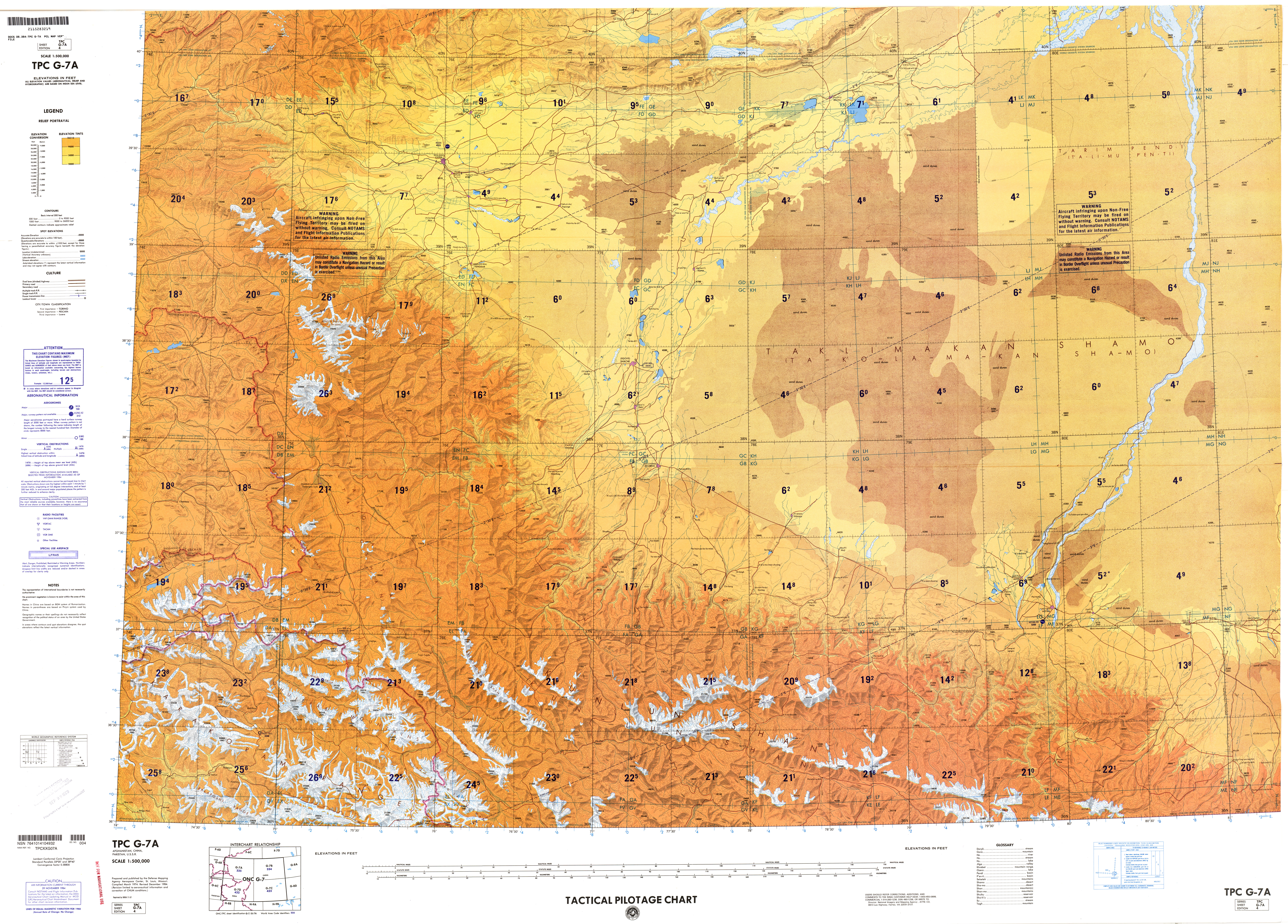
Map of the region including Baykurut (labeled as Baykurt (Pa-yin-k'u-lu-t'i)) (DMA, 1984)

The town's seat is at 2,310 meters above sea level. The highest altitude is 4,200 meters at Karadob (喀拉多别), the lowest altitude is 1,900 meters at Topa (托帕).

== Settlements ==
The town has 2 administration villages and 5 unincorporated villages under its jurisdiction.

2 administration villages:

- Bayqurut Village (Bayinkuluticun) (巴音库鲁提村, بايقۇرۇت كەنتى, بايقۇرۇت قىشتاعى)
- Qyzyl'agyn Village (literally 'red creek')(Kezile'agencun) (克孜勒阿根村, قىزىل ئېغىن كەنتى, قىزىلاعىم قىشتاعى)

== Demographics ==
Historical population
Year	Pop.	±% p.a.
2000	2,304	—
2010	2,225	−0.35%

As of 1997, the population of Baykurut was 99.2% Kyrgyz.

== Economy ==
As of 2004, economically poor persons made up 20.74% of the population of Baykurut and the net mean income in the town was 1,365 RMB.

== Transportation ==
- China-Kyrgyzstan S212 Provincial Highway (中吉公路S212省道) to Torugart Pass
