= Ulugqat County =

Ulugqat County: 乌恰县 (Chinese); ئۇلۇغچات ناھىيىسى (Uyghur); ۇلۇۇچات وودانى (Kyrgyz); Ulughchat, Ulugh Chat, Wuqia
- County
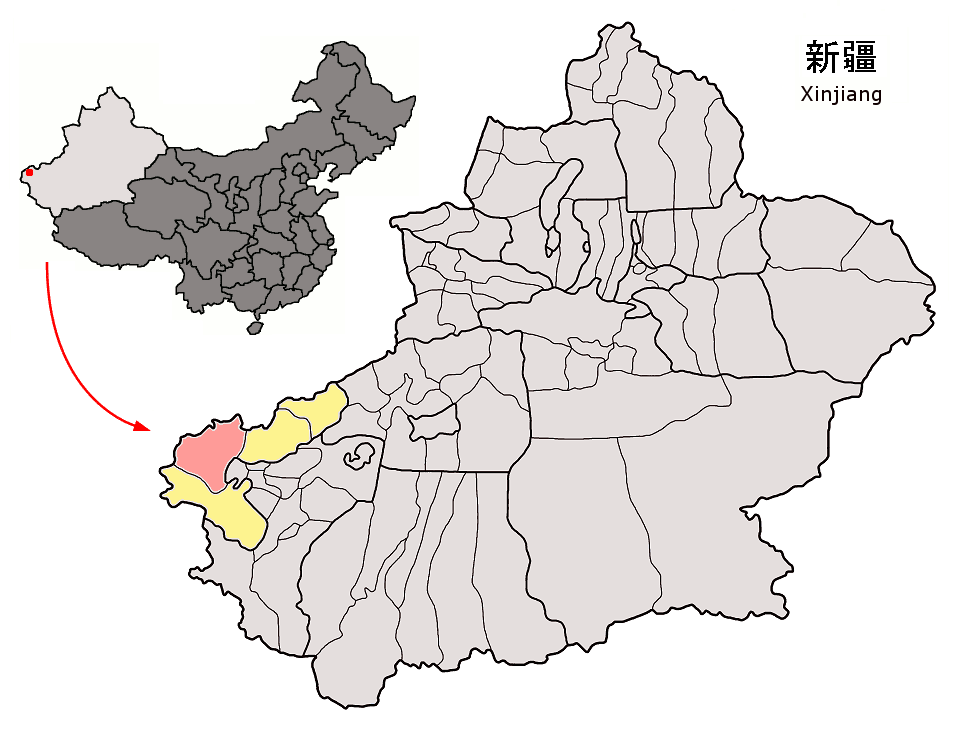
- Ulugqat County (red) within Kizilsu Prefecture (yellow) and Xinjiang

- Location of the seat in Xinjiang Ulugqat (Xinjiang) Ulugqat (China)
- Coordinates (Ulugqat County government): 39°43′09″N 75°15′33″E
- Country: China
- Autonomous region: Xinjiang
- Autonomous prefecture: Kizilsu
- County seat: Ulugqat (Wuqia)

Area
  - Total: 19,118 km^{2} (7,382 sq mi)

Population (2020)
  - Total: 60,912
  - Density: 3.1861/km^{2} (8.2520/sq mi)
- Time zone: UTC+8 (China Standard Time (Note: Locals in Xinjiang frequently observe UTC+6 (Xinjiang Time), 2 hours behind Beijing.))
- Postal code: 845450
- Area code: 653024
- Website: www.xjwqx.gov.cn

Ulugqat County

Chinese name
- Simplified Chinese: 乌恰县
- Traditional Chinese: 烏恰縣
Transcriptions
Standard Mandarin
- Hanyu Pinyin: Wūqià Xiàn
- Wade–Giles: Wu¹-chʻia⁴ Hsien⁴

Alternative Chinese name
- Simplified Chinese: 乌鲁克恰提县
- Traditional Chinese: 烏魯克恰提縣
Transcriptions
Standard Mandarin
- Hanyu Pinyin: Wūlǔkèqiàtí Xiàn

Uyghur name
- Uyghur: ئۇلۇغچات ناھىيىسى
Transcriptions
- Latin Yëziqi: Ulughchat Nahiyisi
- Yengi Yeziⱪ: Uluƣqat Naⱨiyisi
- SASM/GNC: Uluĝqat Nahiyisi
- Siril Yëziqi: Улуғчат Наһийиси

Kyrgyz name
- Kyrgyz: ۇلۇۇچات وودانى; Улуучат ооданы Uluuçat oodanı

Ulugqat County (also known as Ulughchat County and Wuqia County; Chinese: 乌恰县; pinyin: Wūqià Xiàn) is a county in Xinjiang Uygur Autonomous Region, China. It is under the administration of the Kyrgyz autonomous prefecture of Kizilsu. The county has two towns, nine townships and one state-owned farm, eight communities and 34 villages under its jurisdiction in 2017, its county seat is Wuqia Town. It contains an area of 19,118.11 km^{2} (7,381.54 sq mi) and has a population of 56,633 (as of 2017) with main ethnic groups of Kyrgyz, Han and Uyghur peoples.

Wuqia County is one of the two westernmost counties in China. It borders with Artux City to the east, Kashgar City to the south, Akto County to the southwest and the Kyrgyz Republic to the northwest. There are two national-level ports of Turugart (吐尔尕特口岸) and Arkaxtam (伊尔克什坦口岸), which are the link between Central and Western Asia and the bridgehead of opening up to the outside world. The county has harsh natural conditions and is prone to natural disasters.

There are 11 local ethnic groups in the county, such as Kyrgyz, Han, Uyghur, Hui, Uzbek, Tajik, etc. and the Kyrgyz ethnic group accounts for about 80% of the total population of the county. Its total land area of the county is 19,118 square kilometers with an average elevation of 2,890 meters and its county seat is at 2,200 meters above sea level. Of which, mountains, Gobi and wasteland account for 99.8% of the total area; the total area of desert grassland is more than 10,667 square kilometers, arable land is 23,000 mu (1,533 hectares or 3,790 acres), per capita arable land is less than 0.5 mu (0.0333 ha or 333 m^{2} or 0.082 acres). It is a typical plateau animal husbandry county with traditional animal husbandry as the main county.

== Name ==
The name Ulugqat comes from the Kyrgyz language and means branch valleys (山沟分岔口). The name "Wuqia" is Mandarin Chinese for an abbreviated form of the name "Wulukeqiati" (乌鲁克恰提), based on the sound of the Kyrgyz name "Ulugqat". The Kizilsu Valley divides into two separate branch valleys in the area and the place presents the shape of the three mountain valleys.

== History ==
The county of Wuqia was part of Shule Commandery (疏勒都督府) in the Han period. It was in the territory of First Turkic Khaganate and Yarkent Khanate in the 16th century.

It was part of Shufu County in the Qing period. The Ulugqat Branch(乌鲁克恰提分县) was formed from Shufu County in 1913 and the town of Ulugqat was its seat, Ulugqat Branch was changed to Ulugqat Division(乌鲁克恰提设治局) in 1929 and the county of Wuqia was established in 1938 and under administration of Kashgar Administrative Region. The county was amalgamated to Kizilsu Autonomous Prefecture with its establishment in 1954.

A magnitude 7.4 earthquake occurred in Wuqia County on August 23, 1985, and its county seat was destroyed. Later, the new county seat was rebuilt in Borux (博鲁什), 6 km away to the northeast of the former seat. The inauguration ceremony of the new seat was held on October 17, 1989.

On October 5, 2008, a 6.8 magnitude earthquake collapsed 721 houses; there were no casualties. 100 residents were relocated to emergency shelters; another 100 were to live in newly-built homes.

== Demographics ==
The proportion of nationalities in Ulugqat County, 2018
Nationality	Percentage
Kyrgyz	87.2%
Han People	9.8%
Uyghurs	2.6%
Hui People	0.1%
Others	0.3%
Source of the population statistics :

== Geography ==
Wuqia County is located between 39°24′- 40°17′ north latitude and 73°40′- 75°45′ east longitude. It is located in the west of Xinjiang, north of Pamir Plateau, west of Tarim Basin, and two major mountain ranges of southern Tianshan and Kunlun junction. It is adjacent to Artux City in the east, Kashgar City in the south and Akto County in the southwest, it is bordered by the Kyrgyz Republic on the northwest with a boundary line of 410 kilometers. The county is in a temperate arid climate zone, the total area of the county is 19,118 square kilometers, with 10,667 square kilometers of various grasslands, of which 60% of excellent grasslands. There are two national first-level ports of Turugart and the Arkaxtam. The 309 provincial road connects the two ports with Kyrgyzstan, which is a shortcut for import and export trade between China and Central Asian countries.

The county has a dry climate and is prone to earthquakes, floods, snow storms, sandstorms and other frequent natural disasters. From 1905 to the present, there have been 56 recorded earthquakes with a major earthquake of magnitude 6.0 M_{w} or above, and more than 20,000 earthquakes of magnitude below 6.0 M_{w}.

Wuqia County has two major rivers, the Kizi River (克孜河) and the Qakmark River (恰克玛克河), with a surface water resource of 960 million cubic meters.

=== Terrain ===
The terrain of Wuqia County is low in the southeast, high in the northwest and southwest, surrounded by mountains. It is a typical mountainous terrain with an altitude of 1,760 - 6,146 meters and a horseshoe shape. The county is located in the wedge-shaped zone in the west of the Kashgar Delta (喀什三角洲), which is a fold mountains of the Miocene. The landform appears in the mountains of erosion. The mountain area accounts for 76% of the total area of Wuqia County, 14,535 square kilometers. The county is surrounded by mountains on three sides, and the southeast is the Kashgar Delta plain.

=== Fauna and flora ===
Wild animals in Wuqia County include the snow leopard, brown bear, goitered gazelle, wild boar, marmot, snow chicken, and chukar partridge.

Wild medicinal plants include symphytum, liquorice, ferula sinkiangensis, ephedra sinica, plantago, codonopsis, angelica, dandelion, astragalus, cynomorium, and wolfiporia extensa.

=== Mineral resources ===
The mineral resources discovered in Wuqia County include coal, fossil oil, oil shale, iron, copper, lead, zinc, antimony, gold, phosphorus, salt, sulfur, limestone, gypsum, ceramic soil and so on. Among them, coal reserves account for more than half of Kizilsu's coal reserves.

As of 2013, proven lead and zinc reserves of six million tons, natural gas reserves of 40.9 billion cubic meters, copper reserves of 600,000 tons, coal 12.75 million tons, gold 130 tons, iron seven million tons, limestone and gypsum reserves of 100 million tons, water energy resources one million kilowatts. In July 2014, a 100-ton super-large gold mine was discovered in the county.

== Climate ==
Climate data for Ulugqat, elevation 2,176 m (7,139 ft), (1991–2020 normals, extremes 1981–2010)
Month	Jan	Feb	Mar	Apr	May	Jun	Jul	Aug	Sep	Oct	Nov	Dec	Year
Record high °C (°F)	13.4 (56.1)	18.1 (64.6)	23.6 (74.5)	27.4 (81.3)	30.6 (87.1)	33.4 (92.1)	34.6 (94.3)	35.7 (96.3)	29.7 (85.5)	23.8 (74.8)	19.7 (67.5)	14.4 (57.9)	35.7 (96.3)
Mean daily maximum °C (°F)	−0.4 (31.3)	2.3 (36.1)	9.1 (48.4)	16.2 (61.2)	20.4 (68.7)	24.6 (76.3)	26.8 (80.2)	25.6 (78.1)	21.2 (70.2)	14.5 (58.1)	7.8 (46.0)	1.8 (35.2)	14.2 (57.5)
Daily mean °C (°F)	−7.6 (18.3)	−4.0 (24.8)	3.4 (38.1)	10.2 (50.4)	14.3 (57.7)	18.2 (64.8)	20.5 (68.9)	19.5 (67.1)	15.1 (59.2)	8.4 (47.1)	1.3 (34.3)	−5.2 (22.6)	7.8 (46.1)
Mean daily minimum °C (°F)	−12.8 (9.0)	−9.1 (15.6)	−1.7 (28.9)	4.9 (40.8)	9.0 (48.2)	12.6 (54.7)	14.9 (58.8)	14.1 (57.4)	9.6 (49.3)	3.0 (37.4)	−3.7 (25.3)	−9.8 (14.4)	2.6 (36.7)
Record low °C (°F)	−28.1 (−18.6)	−26.4 (−15.5)	−20.1 (−4.2)	−11.6 (11.1)	−3.4 (25.9)	3.8 (38.8)	6.3 (43.3)	4.2 (39.6)	−0.8 (30.6)	−8.6 (16.5)	−20.0 (−4.0)	−29.2 (−20.6)	−29.2 (−20.6)
Average precipitation mm (inches)	3.7 (0.15)	7.8 (0.31)	12.7 (0.50)	16.2 (0.64)	32.4 (1.28)	36.2 (1.43)	36.1 (1.42)	36.7 (1.44)	24.6 (0.97)	10.6 (0.42)	3.7 (0.15)	3.4 (0.13)	224.1 (8.84)
Average precipitation days (≥ 0.1 mm)	3.5	4.3	4.5	4.0	8.0	9.9	9.6	10.4	7.1	3.2	2.2	3.2	69.9
Average snowy days	6.8	7.6	6.1	2.2	0.3	0	0	0	0	1.3	4.1	6.8	35.2
Average relative humidity (%)	59	55	45	37	39	37	38	41	44	45	51	59	46
Mean monthly sunshine hours	187.5	175.0	205.8	234.9	271.6	296.4	310.4	289.5	257.1	241.7	201.5	179.9	2,851.3
Percentage possible sunshine	62	57	55	58	61	66	69	69	70	72	69	62	64
Source: China Meteorological Administration

== Subdivision ==
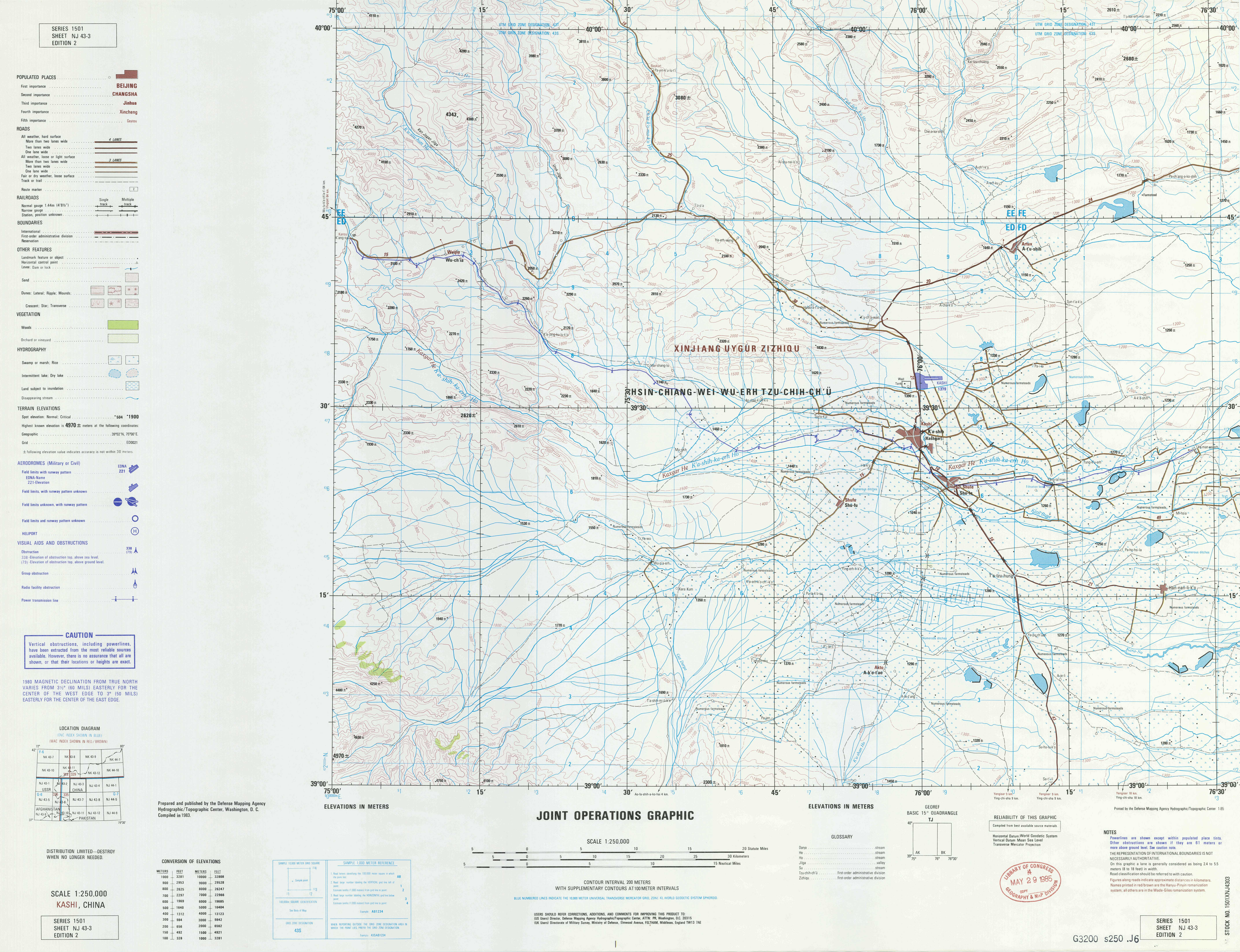
Map including Ulugqat (labeled as Wuqia Wu-ch'ia) (DMA, 1983)

The county was divided into three towns and eight townships, and a pasture farm run by the XPCC.

Name	Simplified Chinese	Hanyu Pinyin	Uyghur (UEY)	Uyghur Latin (ULY)	Kyrgyz (Arabic script)	Kyrgyz (Cyrillic script)	Administrative division code
Towns
Ulugqat Town (Wuqia Town)	乌恰镇	Wūqià Zhèn	ئۇلۇغچات بازىرى	Ulughchat baziri	ۇلۇۇچات شاارچاسى	Улуу-Чат шаарчасы	653024100
Kansu Town (Kangsu Town)	康苏镇	Kāngsū Zhèn	كانسۇ بازىرى	kansu baziri	كەنسۇۇ شاارچاسى	Кен-суу шаарчасы	653024101
Baykurut Town	巴音库鲁提镇	Bāyīnkùlǔtí Zhèn	بايقۇرۇت بازىرى	bayqurut baziri	بايقۇرۇت شاارچاسى	Бай-курут шаарчасы	653024102
Towns
Ulugqat Township	乌鲁克恰提乡	Wūlǔkèqiàtí Xiāng	ئۇلۇغچات يېزىسى	Ulughchat yëzisi	كۅنۅۅ ۇلۇۇچات ايىلى	Көнөө Улуу-Чат айылы	653024200
Oksalur Township	吾合沙鲁乡	Wúhéshālǔ Xiāng	ئوقسالۇر يېزىسى	Oqsalur yëzisi	وقسالىر ايىلى	Оксалыр айылы	653024201
Boritokay Township	膘尔托阔依乡	Biāo'ěrtuōkuòyī Xiāng	بۆرىتوقاي يېزىسى	böritoqay yëzisi	بۅرۉتوقوي ايىلى	Бөрү-токой айылы	653024202
Kiziloy Township	黑孜苇乡	Hēizīwéi Xiāng	قىزىلئۆي يېزىسى	qizil'üy yëzisi	قىزىلۉي ايىلى	Кызыл-үй айылы	653024203
Toyun Township	托云乡	Tuōyún Xiāng	تويۇن يېزىسى	toyun yëzisi	تويۇن ايىلى	Тоюн айылы	653024204
Terak Township	铁列克乡	Tiělièkè Xiāng	تېرەك يېزىسى	tërek yëzisi	تەرەك ايىلى	Терек айылы	653024205
Bostanterak Township	波斯坦铁列克乡	Bōsītǎntiělièkè Xiāng	بوستانتېرەك يېزىسى	bostantërek yëzisi	بوستونتەرەك ايىلى	Бостон-Терек айылы	653024207
Jigin Township	吉根乡	Jígēn Xiāng	جىغىن يېزىسى	jighin yëzisi	جىعىن ايىلى	Жыгын айылы	653024208

- Other:
  - Toyun Ranch (兵团托云牧场, Uyghur: بىڭتۇەن تويۇن چارۋىچىلىق فېرمىسى, Kyrgyz: بىڭتۇان تويۇن چارباچىلىق مايدانى)

== Tourism ==
Wucai County is located in Tianshan, Kunlun Mountains at the intersection of the Pamir Plateau. It is an area with notable cultural diversity as well as characteristic geological and other landscape features. There are locations such as Simhana (斯姆哈纳), the Tianshan and Kunlun canyon intersection, the Yuqitash Steppe (玉其塔什草原), Hongshan Valley (红山谷), Quanhua (泉华), Shanghai Forest Ranch (尚亥森林牧场), Oksalur Township Millennium populus euphratica forest (吾合沙鲁乡千年胡杨林), shell mountains (古海遗址贝壳山) and other touristic sites. Pamir is one of the birthplaces of highland culture. The main ethnic group of the neighboring Kyrgyz Republic and the Chinese Kyrgyz have cultivated a cross-border exchange of resources opening to Central Asia in Wucai County.

== Notable people ==
- Ishaq Beg Munonov
