= Ulugqat Town =

Ulugqat / Wuqia Town 乌恰镇 (乌鲁克恰提镇) (Chinese) ئۇلۇغچات بازىرى (Uyghur) ۇلۇۇچات شاارچاسى (Kyrgyz)
- Town
- Location of the town
- Coordinates: 39.70802308°N 75.26738801°E
- Country: People's Republic of China
- Autonomous region: Xinjiang
- Prefecture: Kizilsu
- County: Ulugqat

Area
  - Total: 288 km^{2} (111 sq mi)

Population (2017)
  - Total: 13,898
- Time zone: UTC+8 (China Standard Time)
- Website: www.xjwqx.gov.cn/sitemap.htm

Ulugqat Town (Kyrgyz: ۇلۇۇچات شاارچاسى, Улуу-Чат шаарчасы; Uyghur: ئۇلۇغچات بازىرى) or Wuqia Town (simplified Chinese: 乌恰镇; traditional Chinese: 烏恰鎮; pinyin: Wūqià Zhèn) is a town and the county seat of Ulugqat County in Xinjiang Uygur Autonomous Region, China. Located in the middle east of the county, the town covers an area of 288 square kilometers with a population of 13,898 (as of 2017). It has five communities, its seat is at Tianhe Road (天合路).

== History ==
Kiziloy Town (黑孜葦鎮) was formed in 1947 and renamed to Chengguan Town (城关镇) in 1984. A magnitude 7.4 earthquake occurred in Ulugqat County on August 23, 1985, and it was destroyed. the new town was rebuilt and named Ulugqat/Wuqia in Bolush (波鲁什), 6 km away to the northeast of the former town.

== Overview ==
Basics for 2017

- Urban planned area: 39.4 square kilometers
  - Urban built-up area: 6.68 square kilometers
- Households: 4,856
- Household population (户籍人口): 13,898 of which
  - Kyrgyz: 6,810 (49.00%)
  - Han: 4,865 (35.01%)
  - Uyghur: 1946 (14.00%)
  - Others: 277 (1.99%)
- Per capita disposable income: CNY26,600 (USD3,940)
- Units within the jurisdiction: 125
- Individual industrial and commercial households: 964
- Mosque: 1

== Residential communities ==
The town has five residential communities under its jurisdiction.

- Baghcha (巴格恰社区, باغچا مەھەللىسى, باقچا قوومدۇق قونۇشۇ)
- Bolush (波鲁什社区, بولۇش مەھەللىسى, بولۇش قوومدۇق قونۇشۇ)
- Dostuq (多斯都克社区, دوستلۇق مەھەللىسى, دوستۇق قوومدۇق قونۇشۇ)
- Ordo (乌尔多社区, ئوردا مەھەللىسى, ئوردو قوومدۇق قونۇشۇ)
- Qanjughan (坎久干社区, قانجۇغان مەھەللىسى, قانجىعان قوومدۇق قونۇشۇ)

== Infrastructure ==
The main streets of Ulugqat Town include Tuanjie Road (团结路), Guangming Road (光明路), Bostanterak Road (波斯坦铁列克路), Tuoyun Road (托云路), Kiziloy Road (黑孜苇路), Xingfu Road (幸福路), Kangsu Road (康苏路) and Ulugqat Road (乌鲁克恰提路). The Minzu Park (民族公园) is the main leisure place for residents. The Earthquake Monument (抗震纪念碑) was built at the northern end of Tuanjie Road. Wu Dengyun Exhibition Hall (吴登云先进事迹展览馆) is located at the eastern end of Xingfu Road.

Tuanjie Road is the main road in downtown and is north-south, it starts south from Gakang Highway (喀康公路) and north to Guangming Road. It is 1000 meters long and 26 meters wide with green belts on both sides, named in 1989. There are county bureaus of agriculture, tax, grain, commerce, and construction, administration for industry and commerce, PBOC, AgBank, etc. along the road.

Guangming Road is the main road east-west in downtown, starting from Toyun Road in the east and Tuanjie Road in the west. It is 950 meters long and 10 meters wide, there are green belts on both sides, named in 1989. Along the way are the CPC County Committee, County Government, courthouse, public prosecutor's office and public security bureau.
