= Artush =

Artush: 阿图什市 (Chinese); ئاتۇش شەھىرى (Uyghur); ارتىش شاارى (Kyrgyz); Artux, Atush
- County-level city
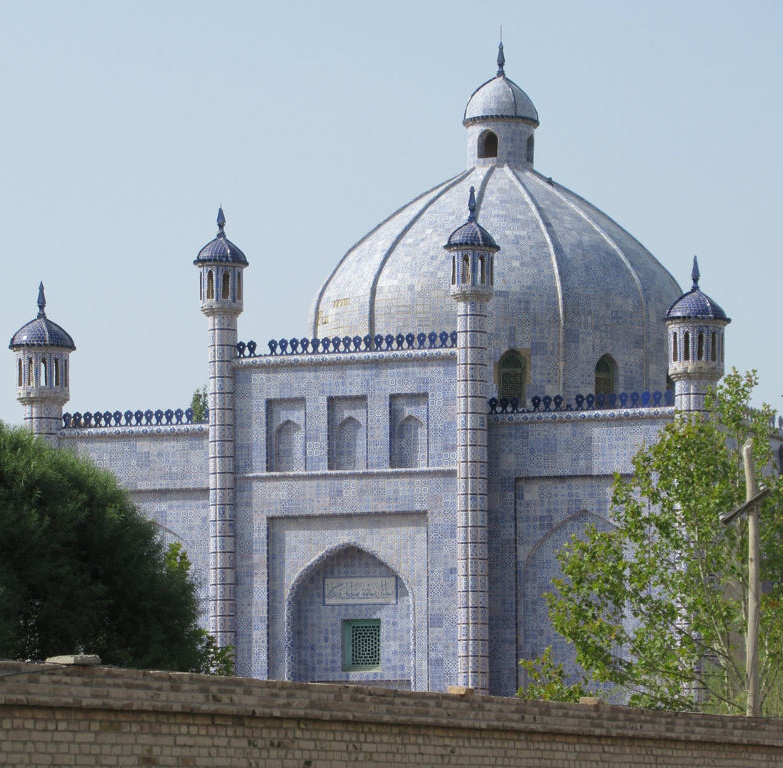
- Tomb of Sultan Satuk Bughra Khan

- Location in Xinjiang Artush (Xinjiang) Artush (China)
- Coordinates (Artush municipal government): 39°42′58″N 76°10′06″E
- Country: China
- Autonomous region: Xinjiang
- Autonomous prefecture: Kizilsu
- Municipal seat: Guangming Road Subdistrict

Area
  - Total: 15,697.78 km^{2} (6,060.95 sq mi)

Population (2020)
  - Total: 290,936
  - Density: 18.5336/km^{2} (48.0017/sq mi)

Demographics
  - Major ethnic groups: 81.4% Uyghurs; 11% Kyrgyz; 7.3% Han Chinese
- Time zone: UTC+8 (China Standard (Note: Locals in Xinjiang frequently observe UTC+6 (Xinjiang Time), 2 hours behind Beijing.))
- Website: www.xjats.gov.cn (in Chinese)

Artush

Chinese name
- Simplified Chinese: 阿图什
- Traditional Chinese: 阿圖什
Transcriptions
Standard Mandarin
- Hanyu Pinyin: Ātúshí
- Wade–Giles: A^{1}-tʻu^{2}-shih^{2}

Uyghur name
- Uyghur: ئاتۇش
Transcriptions
- Latin Yëziqi: Atush
- Yengi Yeziⱪ: Atux
- SASM/GNC: Atux
- Siril Yëziqi: Атуш

Kyrgyz name
- Kyrgyz: ارتىش; Артыш; Artysh

Artush (/ɑːrˈtʊʃ/ ar-TUUSH; also transliterated as Artux or Atush) is a county-level city and the capital of Kizilsu Kyrgyz Autonomous Prefecture in Xinjiang, China. The government seat is in Guangming Road Subdistrict. As of 2018, it has a population of 285,507 people, 81.4 per cent of whom are Uyghurs.

Artush is the political, economic and cultural center of Kizilsu Kyrgyz Autonomous Prefecture.

== History ==
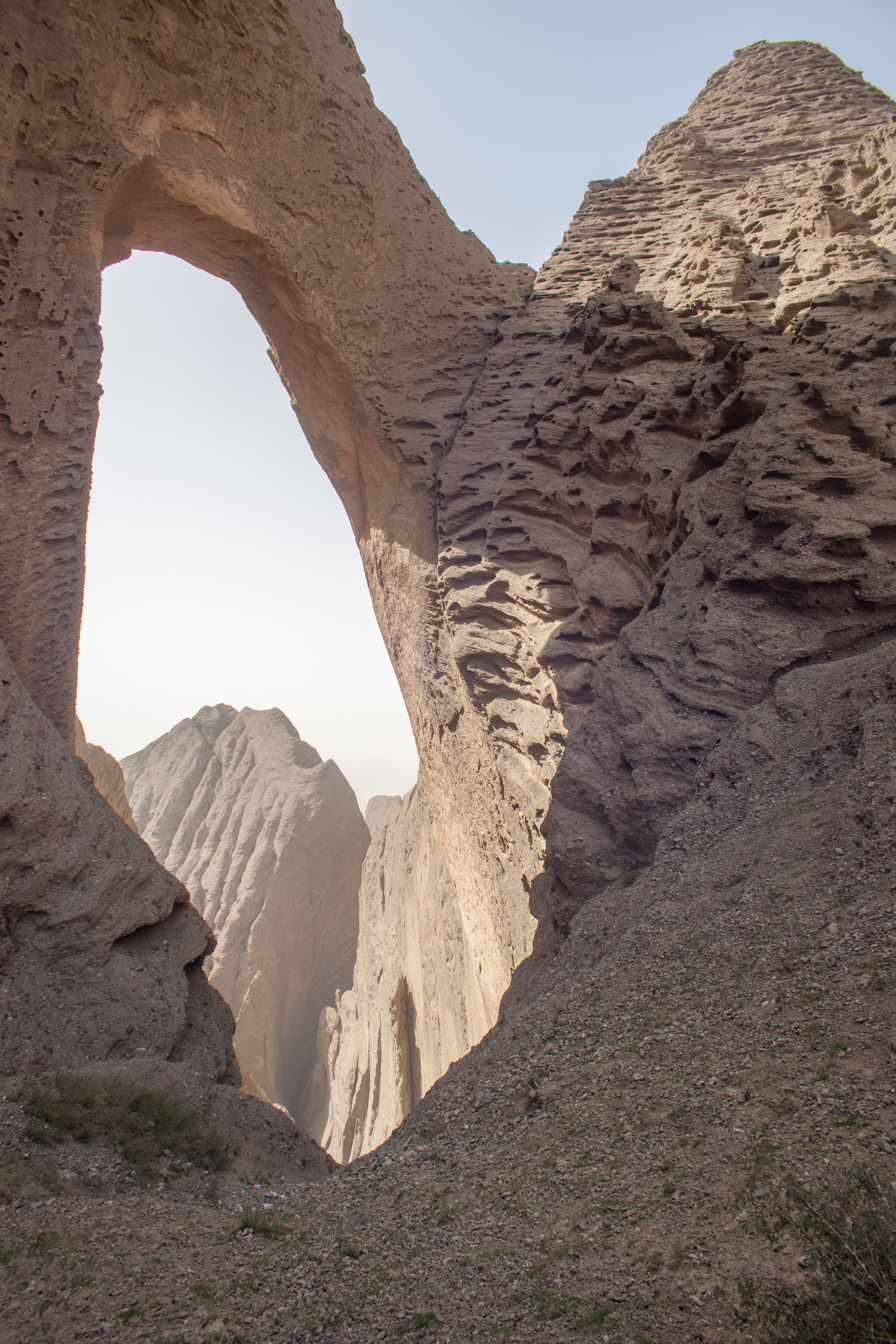
Shipton's Arch

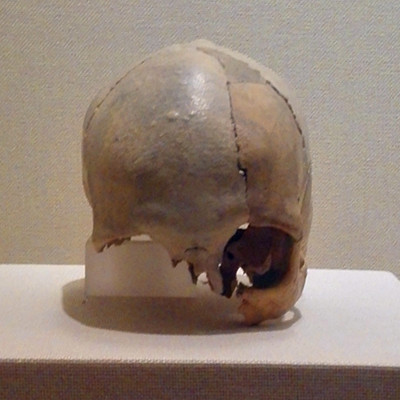
Artush-man skull, dated 10,000 BP, excavated in Arghu village, Artush

In the Han Dynasty, it was a component of Shule, a significant town on the historic Silk Road, and continues to thrive in trade and business. In 60 BC, the Han Dynasty established the Protectorate of the Western Regions. Subsequently, in the Wei and Jin Dynasties, Artush fell under the authority of the Chief Official of the Western Regions, which later became part of Western Turkic Khaganate. In 649, it was incorporated into the Shule Governor's Office of the Protectorate General to Pacify the West.

In 840, the Uyghur Khaganate and other tribes established the Kara-Khanid Khanate, of which Artush was a region. Artush became part of the Chagatai Khanate during the Yuan Dynasty. During the Yuan and Ming Dynasties, Artush was part of the Eastern Chagatai Khanate. The Yarkent Khanate was created during the Ming Dynasty, with Artush as one of its territories.

In 1759, the Qing authorities quelled the turmoil in the large and tiny Hezhuo, placing Artush under the authority of the Minister of Kashgar, referred to as Astu Altush, while Aqimu Burke was established in Atushi Zhuang to oversee local governance. In 1884, Atushi was incorporated into Gansu-Xinjiang Province.

In January 1943, Artush County was established. In 1949, it was part of Kashgar Prefecture. On July 14, 1954, the Kizilsu Kyrgyz Autonomous Prefecture was founded, and Atushi County was placed under its administration, subsequently recognized as the capital of the Autonomous Prefecture. In June 1986, Atushi County was dissolved, leading to the establishment of the city of Atushi.

At 10:23 pm on January 19, 2020, a 5.2 magnitude earthquake struck in Artush.

== Geography and climate ==
It is situated in the northwest part of the Tarim Basin, south of the Tien Shan mountains. Like most of Xinjiang, Artush has a cool arid climate (Köppen BWk) with hot summers, freezing winters and little precipitation and low humidity year-round. The annual mean temperature is 13.1 °C (55.6 °F) and the annual mean precipitation around 95 millimetres or 3.74 inches. Most of this limited precipitation falls from erratic thunderstorms in the summer months, although at this time relative humidity averages less than 35 percent.

Artush is situated at the western periphery of the Tarim Basin, on the southwestern slope of the Tianshan Mountains, characterized by high mountains, ravines, and valleys, with terrain that gradually ascends from south to north.

Artush features undulating high mountains and minor plains, with the topography elevated in the north and declining in the south, gradually dropping from the southwest to the east, resulting in a complex terrain. The northern section of the city features a prominent mountainous region, characterized by the Maydan and Kara Tirzhek mountains of the Tianshan Mountains, along with undulating hills and mountain ranges. The central region comprises the middle highlands and low hills, interspersed with the Tugu Baiti and Harajun basins. The southern region features an intermountain floodplain, integral to the Kashgar delta, characterized by flat topography.

Climate data for Artush, elevation 1,268 m (4,160 ft), (1991–2020 normals, extremes 1981–present)
Month	Jan	Feb	Mar	Apr	May	Jun	Jul	Aug	Sep	Oct	Nov	Dec	Year
Record high °C (°F)	21.1 (70.0)	20.0 (68.0)	28.4 (83.1)	34.9 (94.8)	36.0 (96.8)	39.5 (103.1)	41.0 (105.8)	41.8 (107.2)	37.0 (98.6)	30.9 (87.6)	25.1 (77.2)	18.9 (66.0)	41.8 (107.2)
Mean daily maximum °C (°F)	0.0 (32.0)	6.0 (42.8)	15.2 (59.4)	23.3 (73.9)	27.8 (82.0)	31.7 (89.1)	33.5 (92.3)	32.2 (90.0)	27.7 (81.9)	20.5 (68.9)	11.1 (52.0)	2.0 (35.6)	19.2 (66.7)
Daily mean °C (°F)	−5.0 (23.0)	0.8 (33.4)	9.7 (49.5)	17.2 (63.0)	21.6 (70.9)	25.3 (77.5)	27.1 (80.8)	25.9 (78.6)	21.3 (70.3)	13.9 (57.0)	5.1 (41.2)	−2.7 (27.1)	13.4 (56.0)
Mean daily minimum °C (°F)	−9.0 (15.8)	−3.9 (25.0)	4.4 (39.9)	11.5 (52.7)	15.8 (60.4)	19.3 (66.7)	21.0 (69.8)	19.8 (67.6)	15.3 (59.5)	7.9 (46.2)	0.1 (32.2)	−6.3 (20.7)	8.0 (46.4)
Record low °C (°F)	−20.5 (−4.9)	−20.7 (−5.3)	−7.9 (17.8)	−0.1 (31.8)	4.1 (39.4)	8.1 (46.6)	11.4 (52.5)	11.5 (52.7)	6.5 (43.7)	−2.2 (28.0)	−12.6 (9.3)	−19.9 (−3.8)	−20.7 (−5.3)
Average precipitation mm (inches)	3.3 (0.13)	8.2 (0.32)	6.8 (0.27)	6.0 (0.24)	15.8 (0.62)	14.8 (0.58)	14.5 (0.57)	15.5 (0.61)	10.9 (0.43)	5.8 (0.23)	3.1 (0.12)	3.6 (0.14)	108.3 (4.26)
Average precipitation days (≥ 0.1 mm)	2.2	2.3	1.9	2.0	4.1	5.5	5.6	4.7	3.9	1.3	0.7	2.2	36.4
Average snowy days	6.2	3.9	1.0	0.1	0	0	0	0	0	0	1.0	5.5	17.7
Average relative humidity (%)	63	51	37	29	31	31	33	37	40	43	52	65	43
Mean monthly sunshine hours	147.7	154.2	175.4	210.1	261.9	293.1	307.3	283.3	240.7	227.9	181.4	135.3	2,618.3
Percentage possible sunshine	49	50	47	52	59	66	68	68	66	67	62	47	58
Source: China Meteorological Administration all-time January highall-time February high

== Administrative divisions ==
Artush includes three subdistricts, one town, six townships and one other area:

Name	Simplified Chinese	Hanyu Pinyin	Uyghur (UEY)	Uyghur Latin (ULY)	Kyrgyz (Arabic script)	Kyrgyz (Cyrillic script)	Administrative division code
Subdistricts
Xingfu Road Subdistrict (Bext Road Subdistrict)	幸福路街道	Xìngfúlù Jiēdào	بەخت يولى كوچا باشقارمىسى	bext yoli kocha bashqarmisi	باقىت جولۇ كۅچۅ باشقارماسى	Бакыт жолу көчө башкармасы	653001001
Guangming Road Subdistrict (Nurluq Road Subdistrict)	光明路街道	Guāngmínglù Jiēdào	نۇرلۇق يولى كوچا باشقارمىسى	nurluq yoli kocha bashqarmisi	نۇرلۇق جولۇ كۅچۅ باشقارماسى	Нурлук жолу көчө башкармасы	653001002
Xincheng Subdistrict	新城街道	Xīnchéng Jiēdào	يېڭى شەھەر كوچا باشقارمىسى	yëngi sheher kocha bashqarmisi	جاڭى شاار كۅچۅ باشقارماسى	Жаңы шаар көчө башкармасы	653001003
Towns
Ustun Artush Town (Shang'atushi)	上阿图什镇	Shàng'ātúshí Zhèn	ئۈستۈن ئاتۇش بازىرى	Üstün Atush baziri	ۉستۉن ارتىش شاارچاسى	Үстүн Артыш шаарчасы	653001100
Süntag Town	松他克镇	Sōngtākè Zhèn	سۇنتاغ بازىرى	suntagh baziri	سۇنتاق شاارچاسى	Сунтак шаарчасы	653001101
Azak Town	阿扎克镇	Āzhākè Zhèn	ئازاق بازىرى	Azaq baziri	ازاق شاارچاسى	Азак шаарчасы	653001102
Townships
Agu Township	阿湖乡	Āhú Xiāng	ئاغۇ يېزىسى	Aghu yëzisi	اغۇۇ ايىلى	Агуу айылы	653001102
Katyaylak Township	格达良乡	Gédáliáng Xiāng	كاتتايلاق يېزىسى	kattaylaq yëzisi	كەتتئيلئك ايىلى	Кеттийлек айылы	653001104
Karajül Township (Karajol Township)	哈拉峻乡	Hālājùn Xiāng	قاراجول يېزىسى	qarajol yëzisi	قاراجۉل ايىلى	Кара-Жүл айылы	653001105
Tugurmiti Township	吐古买提乡	Tǔgǔmǎití Xiāng	تۈگۈرمىتى يېزىسى	tügürmiti yëzisi	تەگىرمەتى ايىلى	Тегирмети айылы	653001106

Other:

- Red Flag Farm of 3rd Division, XPCC (兵团农三师红旗农场)

== Economy ==
Artush's economy is primarily agriculture, the agricultural products are mainly cotton, grapes, and sheep.

Industries in Artush include salt-making, cotton-ginning, food processing and cooking oil processing. Agricultural products include wheat, corn, sorghum, sesame, rice and others, and the local specialty is the common fig. Sheep are the main livestock in Artush.

== Demographics ==
Historical population
Year	Pop.	±% p.a.
2000	200,345	—
2010	240,368	+1.84%
2015	269,317	+2.30%
2018	285,507	+1.96%

As of 1997, 81.5% of the population of Artush was Uyghur.

As of 1999, 79.68 per cent of the population of Artush were Uyghur and 7.21 per cent of the population were Han Chinese.

As of 2015, 216,651 (80.44%) of the 269,317 residents of Artush were Uyghurs, 30,174 (11.20%) were Kyrgyz, 21,754 (8.08%) were Han Chinese and 738 were from other ethnic groups.

As of 2018, the population of Artush was 285,507.

Ethnic composition of Artush City, 2018
Nationality	Percentage
Uyghurs	81.4%
Kyrgyz	11.0%
Han	7.3%
Hui	0.1%
Others	0.2%

== Transportation ==
Artush is served by the Southern Xinjiang Railway.

== Historical maps ==
Historical English-language maps including Artush:

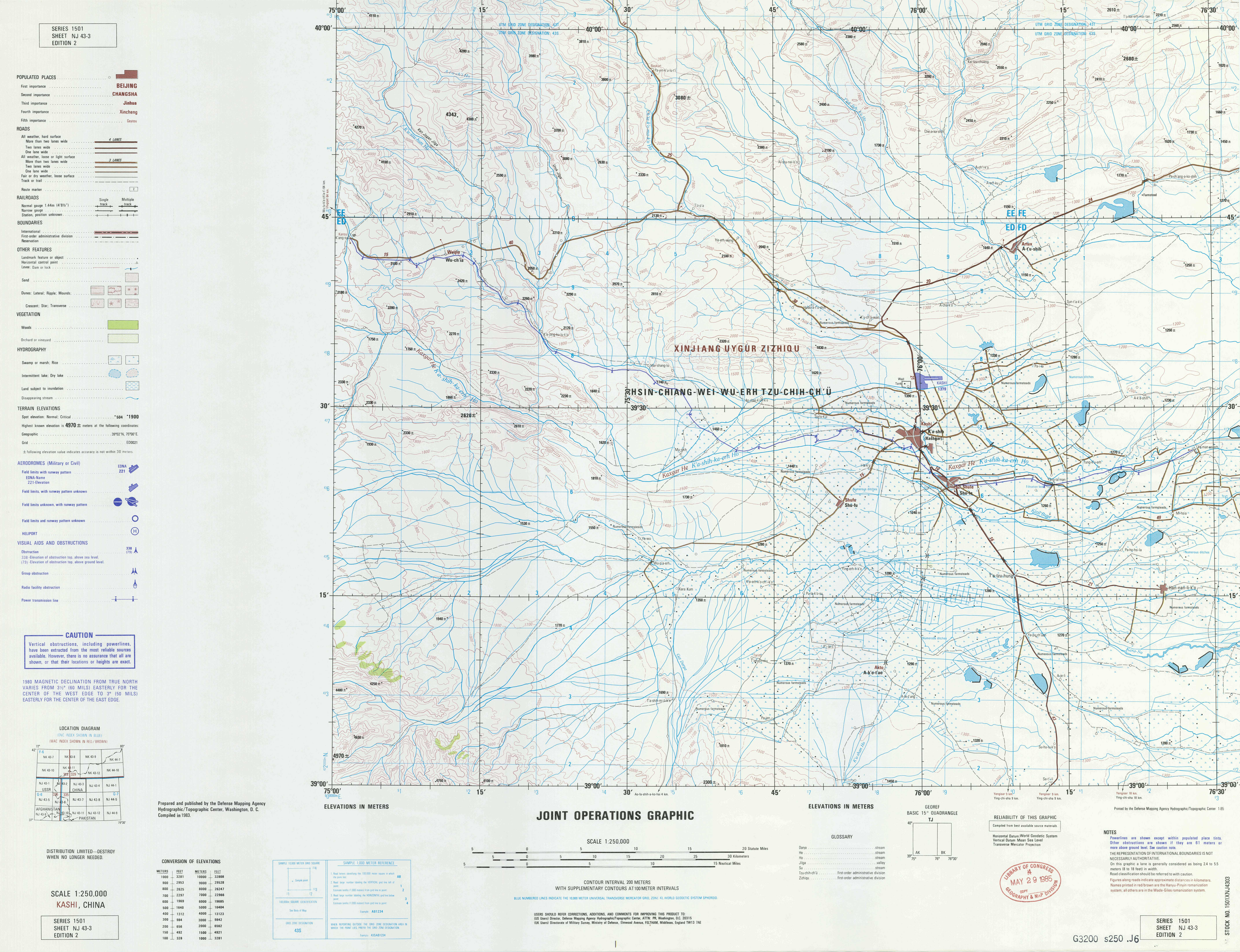
Map including Artush A-t'u-shih (DMA, 1983)

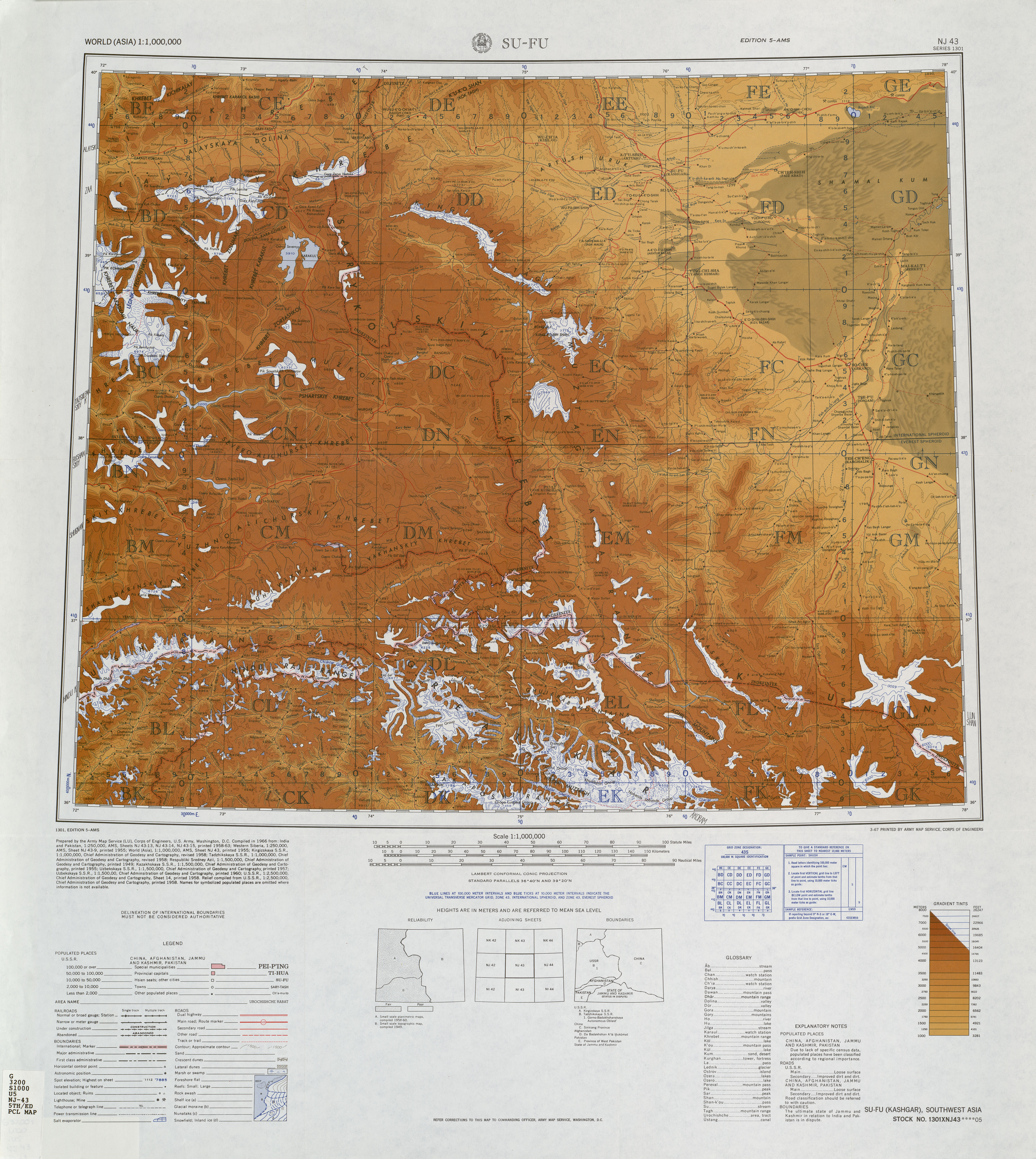
Map including Artush (labeled as A-T'U-SHIH (ARTUSH)) (AMS, 1966) (Note: From map: "DELINEATION OF INTERNATIONAL BOUNDARIES MUST NOT BE CONSIDERED AUTHORITATIVE")

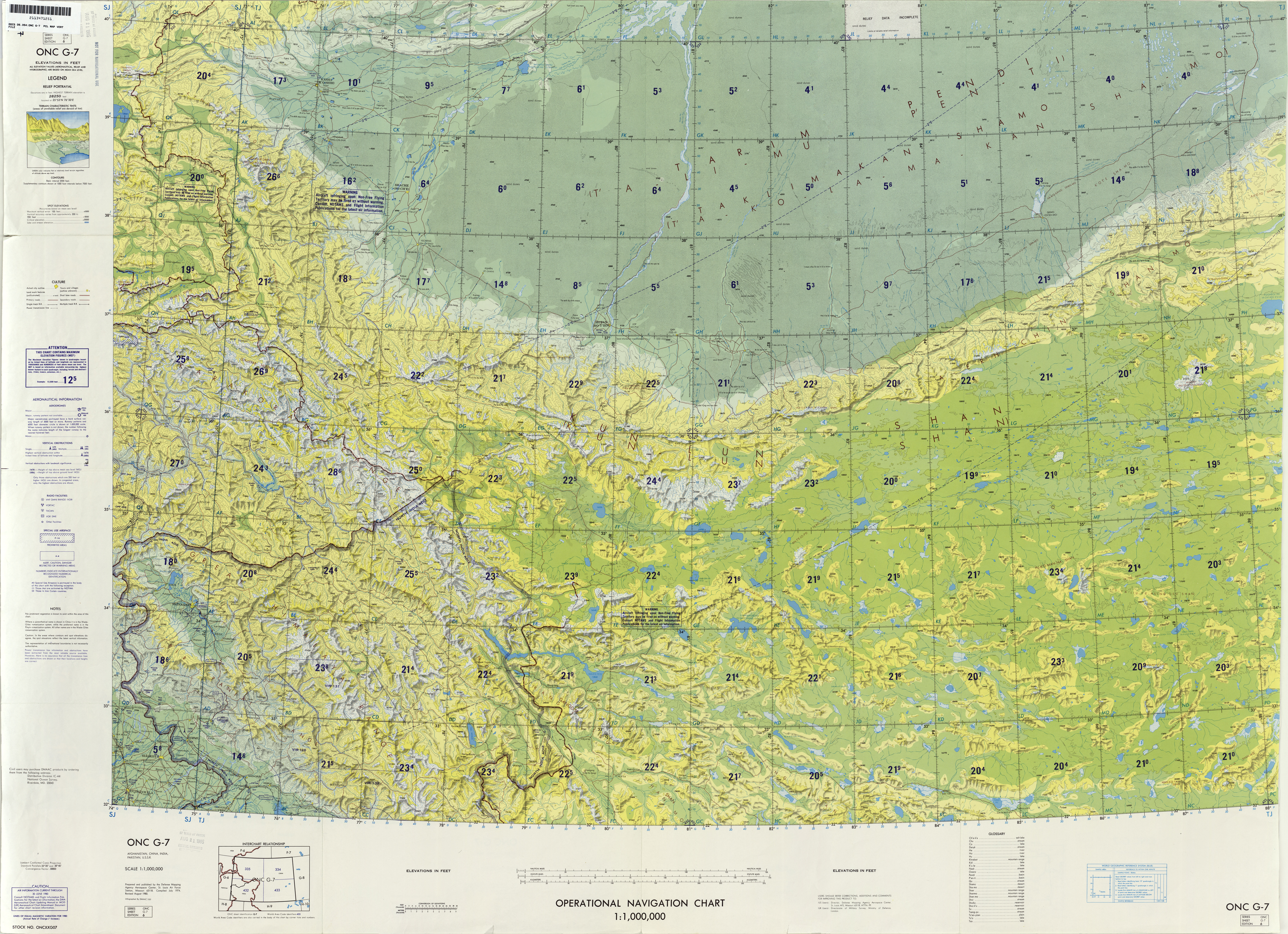
From the Operational Navigation Chart; map including Artush (A-t'u-shih) (DMA, 1980) (Note: From map: "The representation of international boundaries is not necessarily authoritative.")

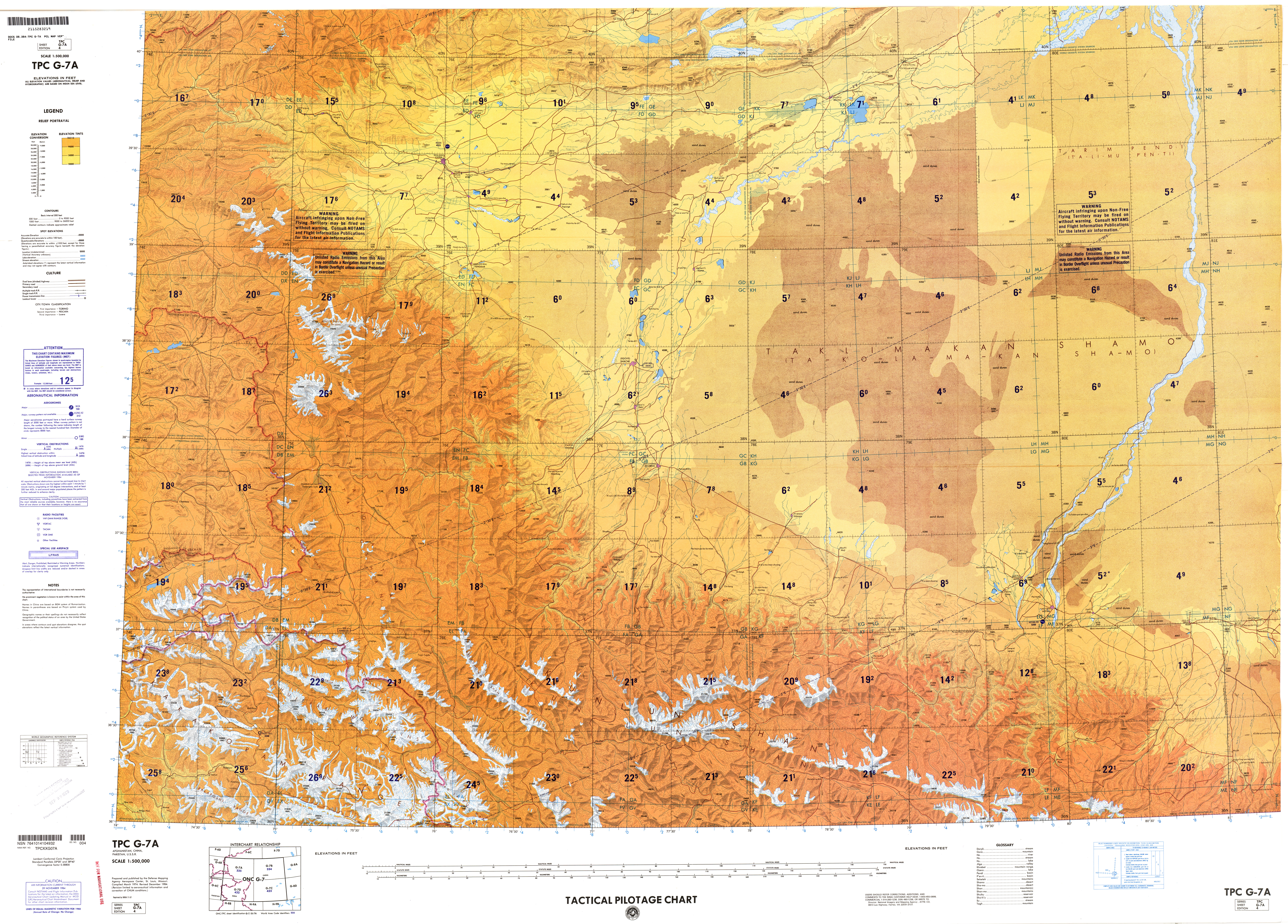
Map including Artush (A-t'u-shih) (DMA, 1984) (Note: From map: "The representation of international boundaries is not necessarily authoritative")
