= Kizilsu Kyrgyz Autonomous Prefecture =

Autonomous prefecture in Xinjiang, China

Coordinates: 39.71°N 76.17°E

- Autonomous prefecture

Name transcription(s)
  - Chinese: 克孜勒苏柯尔克孜自治州
  - Uyghur: قىزىلسۇ قىرغىز ئاپتونوم ئوبلاستى
  - Kyrgyz: قىزىلسۇۇ قىرعىز اپتونوم وبلاسى
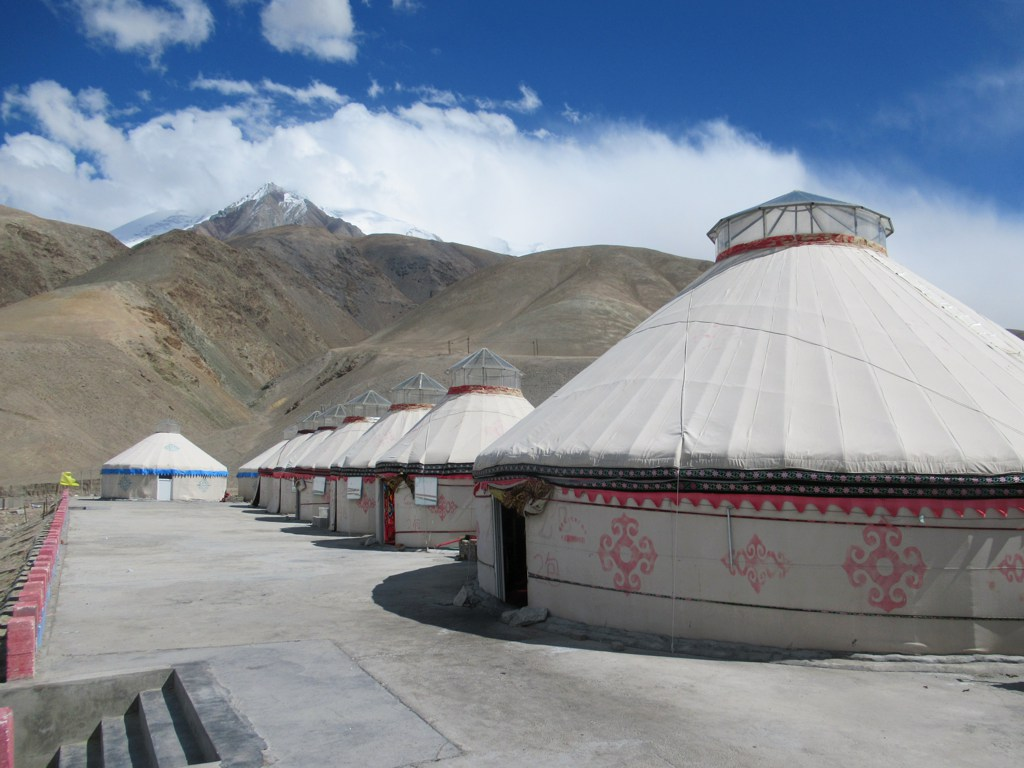
- Kyrgyz yurts in Bulungkol, Akto County
- Etymology: From the Kezi or Kizilsu River, Kizilsu meaning "red water" in the Kyrgyz and Uyghur languages.
- Kizilsu Prefecture (red) in Xinjiang (orange)
- Country: People's Republic of China
- Region: Xinjiang
- Capital: Artush

Area
  - Total: 70,916 km^{2} (27,381 sq mi)
- Elevation: 1,150–7,000 m (3,770–22,970 ft)

Population (2020 Census)
  - Total: 622,222
  - Density: 8.7741/km^{2} (22.725/sq mi)

Demographics
  - Major ethnic groups: 66.2% Uyghurs; 26.2% Kyrgyz; 6.2% Han Chinese

GDP
  - Total: CN¥ 15.9 billion US$ 2.3 billion
  - Per capita: CN¥ 25,556; US$ 3,698
- Time zone: UTC+8 (China Standard)
- ISO 3166 code: CN-XJ-30
- Website: www.xjkz.gov.cn (in Chinese)

Kizilsu Kyrgyz Autonomous Prefecture

Chinese name
- Traditional Chinese: 克孜勒蘇柯爾克孜自治州
- Simplified Chinese: 克孜勒苏柯尔克孜自治州
Transcriptions
Standard Mandarin
- Hanyu Pinyin: Kèzīlèsū Kē'ěrkèzī Zìzhìzhōu
- Wade–Giles: Kʻo^{4}-tzŭ^{1}-lê^{4}-su^{1} Kʻo^{1}-êrh^{3}-kʻo^{4}-tzŭ^{1} Tzŭ^{4}-chih^{4}-chou^{1}
other Mandarin
- Xiao'erjing: كْذِلْصُوَع كْعَركْذِ ذِجِجِوْ

Uyghur name
- Uyghur: قىزىلسۇ قىرغىز ئاپتونوم ئوبلاستى
Transcriptions
- Latin Yëziqi: Qizilsu Qirghiz Aptonom Oblasti
- Yengi Yeziⱪ: Ⱪizilsu Ⱪirƣiz Aptonom Oblasti
- SASM/GNC: K̂izilsu K̂irĝiz Aptonom Oblasti
- Siril Yëziqi: Қизилсу Қирғиз аптоном области

Kyrgyz name
- Kyrgyz: قىزىلسۇۇ قىرعىز اپتونوم وبلاسى; Кызылсуу Кыргыз аптоном обласы Kyzylsuu Kyrgyz aptonom oblasy

Kizilsu Kyrgyz Autonomous Prefecture (Note: Kirgiz is the official English spelling of Kyrgyz in China.) (Note: Chinese: 克孜勒苏柯尔克孜自治州; pinyin: Kèzīlèsū Kē'ěrkèzī Zìzhìzhōu; Uyghur: قىزىلسۇ قىرغىز ئاپتونوم ئوبلاستى, romanized: Qizilsu Qirghiz Aptonom Oblasti; Kyrgyz: قىزىلسۇۇ قىرعىز اپتونوم وبلاسى, romanized: Kyzylsuu Kyrgyz aptonom oblasy) is an autonomous prefecture in western Xinjiang, China, bordering Kyrgyzstan and Tajikistan. Its capital is Artush. The prefecture is home to 622,222 people (as of 2020) and covers an area of 70,916 km^{2} (27,381 sq mi). Most Kyrgyz in China reside in Kizilsu; they make up a little over a quarter of the prefecture's population. The Uyghurs are the largest ethnic group in Kizilsu, consisting of nearly two-thirds of the population.

== Etymology ==
The name Kizilsu (also spelled Kezilesu, derived from Chinese pinyin) refers to the Kezi River and means "red water" in the Kyrgyz and Uyghur languages. Kiziloy, Kizilto, and the Kizil Caves are nearby places that also use the prefix kizil (red).

== History ==
Kizilsu was within the territory of the First East Turkestan Republic, which lasted from November 1933 to April 1934. The establishment of the short-lived breakaway state was thanks in part to a political and military alliance between Uyghurs and Kyrgyz in western Xinjiang.

Following the incorporation of Xinjiang into the People's Republic of China, the Southern Xinjiang Administrative Office of the People's Republic of China (PRC) established the Kizilsu Kyrgyz Autonomous Region on 14 July 1954. The autonomous region was reorganised as an autonomous prefecture in February 1955.

In 1955, the townships of Barin, Jamaterek, and Ujme were transferred from Yengisar County to Akto County, as was Bulungkol from Taxkorgan Tajik Autonomous County of Kashgar Prefecture.

In April 1990, a protest in Barin against forced abortions and mass sterilizations of Uyghur women escalated into an armed insurrection, in what came to be known as the Barin uprising.

== Subdivisions ==
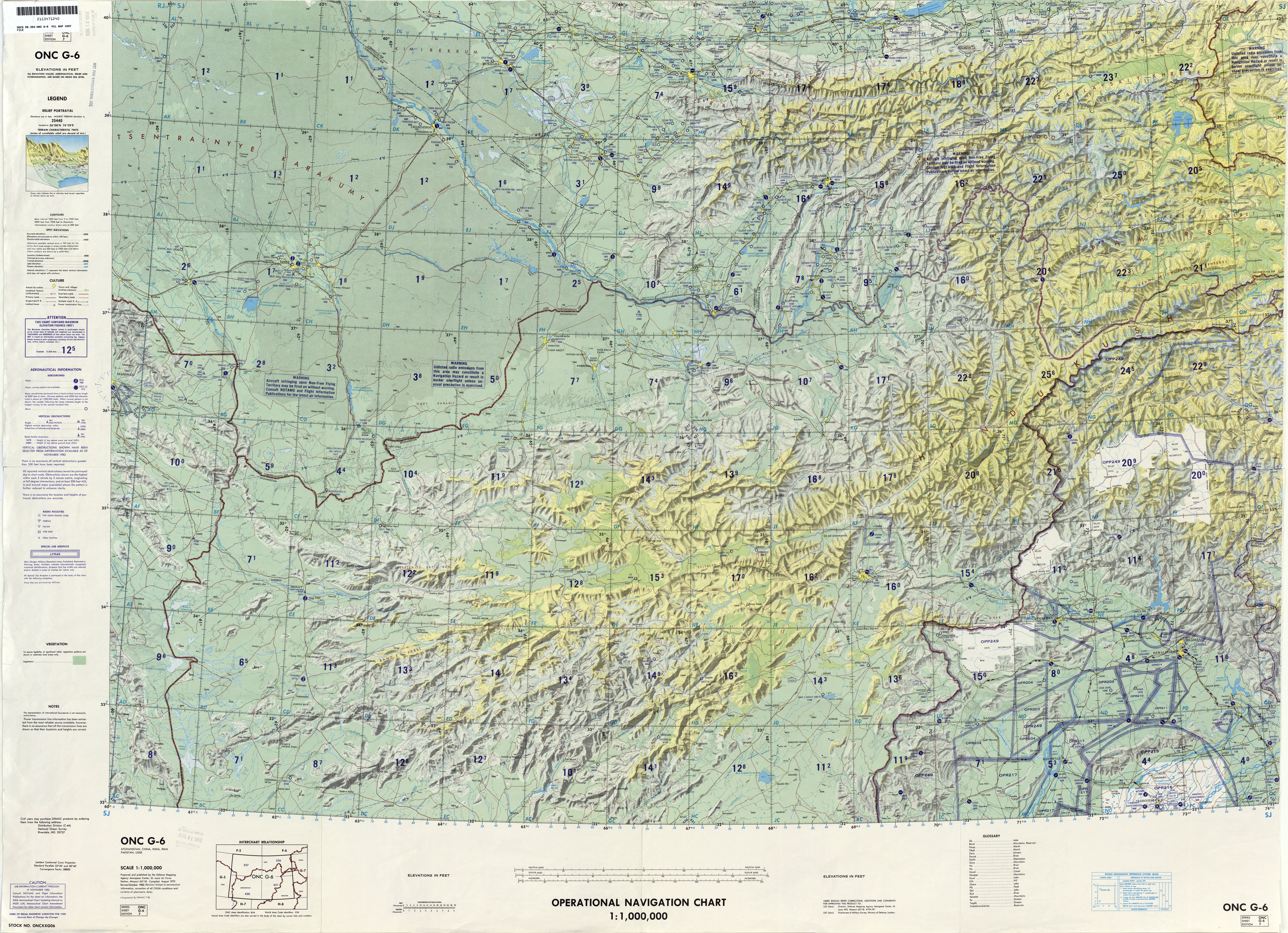
Map including the westernmost point of China (DMA, 1982)

Kizilsu directly administers one county-level city and three counties.

(Note: This map does not reflect changes to the China–Tajikistan border.)
#	Name	Simplified Chinese	Hanyu Pinyin	Uyghur (UEY)	Uyghur Latin (ULY)	Kyrgyz (Arabic script)	Kyrgyz (Cyrillic script)	Kyrgyz Latin transcription	Population (2020 Census)	Area (km^{2})	Density (km^{2})
1	Artush	阿图什市	Ātúshí Shì	ئاتۇش شەھىرى	Atush Shehiri	ارتىش شاارى	Артыш шаары	Artysh shaary	290,936	15,698	18.53
2	Akto County	阿克陶县	Ākètáo Xiàn	ئاقتو ناھىيىسى	Aqto Nahiyisi	اقتوو وودانى	Актоо ооданы	Aktoo oodany	226,005	24,555	9.20
3	Akqi County	阿合奇县	Āhéqí Xiàn	ئاقچى ناھىيىسى	Aqchi Nahiyisi	اقچىي وودانى	Акчий ооданы	Akchiy oodany	44,369	11,545	3.84
4	Wuqia County	乌恰县	Wūqià Xiàn	ئۇلۇغچات ناھىيىسى	Ulughchat Nahiyisi	ۇلۇۇچات وودانى	Улуучат ооданы	Uluuchat oodany	60,912	19,118	3.19

== Demographics ==
According to the 2020 census, Kizilsu has 622,222 inhabitants with a population density of 6.36 inhabitants per km^{2}. Most Kyrgyz in China (80 per cent) reside in Kizilsu. As of 2013, 27 per cent of the inhabitants of the prefecture were Kyrgyz.

Population by ethnicity

Nationality	2000		2010		2018	
Nationality	Population	%	Population	%	Population	%
Uyghur	281,306	63.98%	339,926	64.68%	413,655	66.24%
Kyrgyz	124,533	28.32%	143,582	27.32%	163,863	26.24%
Han	28,197	6.41%	35,629	6.78%	39,292	6.29%
Tajiks	4,662	1.06%	5,547	1.06%	6,097	0.98%
Hui	432	0.10%	447	0.08%	586	0.09%
Uzbek			44	0.01%	196	0.03%
Kazakhs			88	0.02%	180	0.03%
Manchu			33	0.01%	86	0.01%
Mongol			40	0.01%	66	0.01%
Tatars					35	0.01%
Sibe					33	0.01%
Russians					5	<0.01%
Daur					2	<0.01%
Tibetan			51	0.01%		
Tujia			49	0.01%		
Others	558	0.13%	134	0.03%	400	0.06%
Total	439,688	100%	525,570	100%	624,496	100%

== Government ==
=== Chinese Communist Party Committee Secretary ===
- Yan Fenxin
- Zeng Cun
- Zhang Jinbiao
- Liu Huijun
- An Zhengyu

=== Governor ===
- Horigul Jappar (1998–2006)
- Perhat Turdi (2007–2016)
- Dilshat Kidirhan (2017–present)
