= List of township-level divisions of Xinjiang =

This is a list of township-level divisions (formal fourth-level administrative divisions including towns, townships, subdistricts and county districts) of the Xinjiang Uyghur Autonomous Region, People's Republic of China.

List of administrative divisions in Sinkiang (CIA, 1948)

== Ürümqi ==
=== Ürümqi County ===
- Anningqu

== Aksu Prefecture ==
=== Aksu City ===
Subdistrict (街道)

- Langan Subdistrict (栏杆街道), Yinbaza Subdistrict (英巴扎街道), Hongqiao Subdistrict (红桥街道), Xincheng Subdistrict (新城街道), Nancheng Subdistrict (南城街道)

Town (镇)

- Kaletale (喀勒塔勒镇), Ayikule (阿依库勒镇)

Township (乡)

- Yiganqi Township (依干其乡), Baimetugeman Township (拜什吐格曼乡), Tuopuluke Township (托普鲁克乡), Kumubaxi Township (库木巴希乡), Tuokayi Township (托喀依乡)

=== Onsu / Wensu County ===
Towns (بازىرى / 镇):

- Wensu Town (Onsu; ئونسۇ بازىرى / 温宿镇), Tumshuq (Tumuxiuke; تۇمشۇق بازىرى / 吐木秀克镇, formerly 吐木秀克乡), Qizil (Kezile; قىزىل بازىرى / 克孜勒镇, formerly 克孜勒乡), Aral (Arele; ئارال بازىرى / 阿热勒镇, formerly 阿热勒乡), Jam (Jiamu; جام بازىرى / 佳木镇, formerly 佳木乡), Tuofuhan (托甫汗镇), Gongqingtuan (共青团镇), Kekeya (柯柯牙镇)

Townships (يېزىسى / 乡):

- Toxula Township (Tuohula; توخۇلا يېزىسى / 托乎拉乡), Chaghraq Township (Qiagelake; چاغراق يېزىسى / 恰格拉克乡), Ishlemchi Township (Yixilaimuqi; ئىشلەمچى يېزىسى / 依希来木其乡), Gulawat Township (Gule'awanti; گۈلئاۋات يېزىسى / 古勒阿瓦提乡), Bozdong Kyrgyz Ethnic Township (Bozidun, Baozidun; بوزدۆڭ قىرغىز يېزىسى / 博孜墩柯尔克孜族乡 / 包孜墩柯尔克孜族乡)

=== Kuchar County ===
Subdistricts (كوچا باشقارمىسى / 街道):

- Reste Subdistrict (Resitan; رەستە كوچا باشقارمىسى / 热斯坦街道), Saqsaq Subdistrict (Sakesake; ساقساق كوچا باشقارمىسى / 萨克萨克街道), Yengisheher Subdistrict (Xincheng; يېڭىشەھەر كوچا باشقارمىسى / 新城街道), Sherqiy Subdistrict (Dongcheng; شەرقىي شەھەر كوچا باشقارمىسى / 东城街道)

Towns (بازىرى / 镇):

- Uchar (Wuqia; ئۇچار بازىرى / 乌恰镇), Alaqagha (Alahage; ئالاقاغا بازىرى / 阿拉哈格镇), Chimen (Qiman; چىمەن بازىرى / 齐满镇), Dongqotan (Dunkuotan; دۆڭقوتان بازىرى / 墩阔坦镇), Yaqa (Yaha; ياقا بازىرى / 牙哈镇), Uzun (Wuzun; ئۇزۇن بازىرى / 乌尊镇), Ishxila (Yixihala; ئىشخىلا بازىرى / 伊西哈拉镇), Erbatai (二八台镇)

Townships (يېزىسى / 乡):

- Uchosteng Township (Yuqiwusitang; ئۈچئۆستەڭ يېزىسى / 玉奇吾斯塘乡), Behishbagh Township (Bixibage; بېھىشباغ يېزىسى / 比西巴格乡), Xanqitam Township (Hanikatamu; خانقىتام يېزىسى / 哈尼喀塔木乡), Aqosteng Township (Akewusitang; ئاقئۆستەڭ يېزىسى / 阿克吾斯塘乡), Aghi Township (Age; ئاغى يېزىسى / 阿格乡), Tarim Township (Talimu; تارىم يېزىسى / 塔里木乡)

Other areas:

- Kuqa Economic and Technological Development Zone (库车经济技术开发区)

=== Xayar County ===
Towns (بازىرى / 镇):

- Xayar Town (Shaya, Shayar; شايار بازىرى / 沙雅镇), Toyboldi (Tuoyibaoledi; تويبولدى بازىرى / 托依堡勒迪镇, formerly 托依堡勒迪乡), Qizilbayraq (Hongqi; قىزىلبايراق بازىرى / 红旗镇, formerly 红旗乡), Yengimehelle (Yingmaili; يېڭىمەھەللە بازىرى / 英买里镇, formerly 英买里乡), Xadadong (Hadedun; خادادۆڭ بازىرى / 哈德墩镇), Gulbagh (Gulebage; گۈلباغ بازىرى / 古勒巴格镇, formerly 古勒巴格乡), Qaylor (Hailou; قايلور بازىرى / 海楼镇, formerly 海楼乡)

Townships (يېزىسى / 乡):

- Nurbagh Township (Nu'erbage; نۇرباغ يېزىسى / 努尔巴格乡), Tarim Township (Talimu; تارىم يېزىسى / 塔里木乡), Gezqum Township (Gaizikumu; گەزقۇم يېزىسى / 盖孜库木乡), Yantaqsheher Township (Yangtakexiehai'er; يانتاقشەھەر يېزىسى / 央塔克协海尔乡)

Other areas

- Xinken Farm (新垦农场), No. 2 Pasture (二牧场), Xayar Prison (沙雅监狱), Xayar County Industrial Zone (沙雅县工业集中区)

=== Toksu County ===
Towns (بازىرى / 镇):

- Toksu Town (Xinhe, Toqsu; توقسۇ بازىرى / 新和镇), Icheriq (Yiqi'airike; ئىچئېرىق بازىرى / 依其艾日克镇, formerly 依其艾日克乡), Yultuzbagh (Youludusibage; يۇلتۇزباغ بازىرى / 尤鲁都斯巴格镇, formerly 尤鲁都斯巴格乡), Tasheriq (Tashi'airike; 塔什艾日克镇, formerly تاشئېرىق يېزىسى / 塔什艾日克乡),

Townships (يېزىسى / 乡):

- Peyshenbebazar (Paixianbaibazha; پەيشەنبەبازار يېزىسى / 排先拜巴扎乡), Ogen (Weigan; ئۆگەن يېزىسى / 渭干乡), Üchqat (Yuqikate; ئۆگەن يېزىسى / 玉奇喀特乡), Tamtoghraq (Tamutuogelake; تامتوغراق يېزىسى / 塔木托格拉克乡)

Other areas:

- 央塔库都片区管委会乡, 新和县轻工业园区生活区, 新和县物流园区生活区, 新和县新材料园区生活区

=== Baicheng County ===
Towns (镇):

- Baicheng Town (拜城镇), Terek (铁热克镇)

Townships (乡):

- Keyir Township (黑英山乡), Kezil Township (克孜尔乡), Sairam Township (赛里木乡), Tohsun Township (托克逊乡), Yatur Township (亚吐尔乡), Kangqi Township (康旗乡), Bulung Township (布隆乡), Miqigh Township (米吉克乡), Onbash Township (温巴什乡), Qong Kowruk Township (大桥乡), Karabagh Township (老虎台乡)

=== Uqturpan County ===
Towns (بازىرى / 镇):

- Uqturpan Town (Uchturpan, Wushi; ئۇچتۇرپان بازىرى / 乌什镇), Aqyar Township (Aheya; 阿合雅镇, formerly 阿合雅乡), Imam Township (Yimamu; ئىمام بازىرى / 依麻木乡, formerly 依麻木乡)

Townships ( يېزىسى / 乡):

- Aqtoqay Township (Aketuohai; ئاقتوقاي يېزىسى / 阿克托海乡), Achatagh Township (Aqiatage; ئاچاتاغ يېزىسى / 阿恰塔格乡), Yakowruk Township (Yakeruike; ياكۆۋرۈك يېزىسى / 亚科瑞克乡), Yengiawat Township (Ying'awati; يېڭىئاۋات يېزىسى / 英阿瓦提乡), Otbeshi Township (Aotebeixi; ئوتبېشى يېزىسى / 奥特贝希乡), Yamansu Kyrgyz Ethnic Township (يامانسۇ قىرغىز يېزىسى / 亚曼苏柯尔克孜族乡)

=== Awat County ===
Towns (بازىرى / 镇):

- Awat Town (Awati; ئاۋات بازىرى / 阿瓦提镇), Besheriq (Baishi'airike; بەشئېرىق بازىرى / 拜什艾日克镇), Ghoruchol (Wuluquele; غورۇچۆل بازىرى / 乌鲁却勒镇), Tamtoghraq (Tamutuogelake; تامتوغراق بازىرى / 塔木托格拉克镇), Yengieriq (Ying'airike; يېڭىئېرىق بازىرى / 英艾日克镇)

Townships (يېزىسى / 乡):

- Aybagh Township (Ayibage; ئايباغ يېزىسى / 阿依巴格乡), Dolan Township (Duolang; دولان يېزىسى / 多浪乡), Baytoghraq Township (Bagetuolake; بايتوغراق يېزىسى / 巴格托格拉克乡)

Other areas

- Aksu Prison (阿克苏监狱)

=== Kalpin County ===
Towns (بازىرى / 镇):

- Kalpin Town (Keping, Kelpin, كەلپىن بازىرى / 柯坪镇), Gezlik (Gaizilike; گەزلىك بازىرى / 盖孜力克镇), Achal (Aqiale; ئاچال بازىرى / 阿恰勒镇, formerly Achal Township 阿恰勒乡)

Townships (يېزىسى / 乡):

- Yurchi Township (Yu'erqi; يۇرچى يېزىسى / 玉尔其乡), Chilan Township (Qilang; چىلان يېزىسى / 启浪乡)

== Altay Prefecture ==
=== Altay City ===
Subdistricts (街道)

- Jinshan Road Subdistrict (金山路街道) | Jiefang Road Subdistrict (解放路街道) | Tuanjie Road Subdistrict (团结路街道)

Town (镇)

- Aweitan (阿苇滩镇) | Hongdu (红墩镇)

Township 乡

- Qimuerqieke Township (切木尔切克乡) | 阿拉哈克乡 | 汗德尕特蒙古族乡 | 拉斯特乡 | 喀拉希力克乡 | 萨尔胡松乡 | 巴里巴盖乡 | 切尔克齐乡

Others

- Kalagashi Ranch 喀拉尕什牧场 | Aketumusike Ranch 阿克吐木斯克牧场 | 兵团181团 | 兵团189团

=== Burqin County ===
Town (镇)

- Burqin Town (布尔津镇)

Township (乡)

- Burqin Township (布尔津乡) | Woyimoke Township (窝依莫克乡) | Dulaiti Township (杜来提乡) | Kuositeke Township (阔斯特克乡) | Chonghuer Township (冲乎尔乡) | Yegezizabie Township (也格孜托别乡)

Ethnic Township (民族乡)

- Hemuhanasi Mongol Township (禾木哈纳斯蒙古族乡)

=== Fuyun County ===
Town (镇)

- Kueerqisi Township (库额尔齐斯镇), Keketuohai Township (可可托海镇), Qiakuertu Township (恰库尔图镇)

Township (乡)

- Tuerhong Township (吐尔洪乡), Dure Township 杜热乡, Kuerte Township 库尔特乡, Kalatongke Township (喀拉通克乡), Tiemaike Township (铁买克乡), Kalabulegen Township 喀拉布勒根乡

=== Fuhai County ===
Town (镇)

- Fuhai Town (福海镇)

Township (乡)

- Jietearele Township (解特阿热勒乡), Kekeagashi Township (科克阿尕什乡), Qiganjisong Township (齐干吉迭乡), Kalamagai Township (喀拉玛盖乡), Aerda Township (阿尔达乡)

Others

- 兵团182团, 兵团183团, 兵团187团, 兵团188团, 兵团190团

=== Habahe County ===
Town (镇)

- Makeqi 阿克齐镇

Township (乡)

- Saertamu Township (萨尔塔木乡) | Jiayilema Township (加依勒玛乡) | Kulebai Township (库勒拜乡) | Saerbulake Township (萨尔布拉克乡) | Tireketi Township (铁热克提乡) | Qiba'er Township (齐巴尔乡)

Others

- 兵团185团

=== Qinggil County ===
Town (镇)

- Qinggil Town (青河镇) | Takeshiken (塔克什肯镇)

Township (乡)

- Arele Township (阿热勒乡) | Areletuobie Township (阿热勒托别乡) | Saertuohai Township (萨尔托海乡) | Chaganguole Township (查干郭勒乡) | Agashiaopao Township (阿尕什敖包乡)

Military Base (兵团单位)

- Qinghe Farm (青河农场)

=== Jeminay County ===
Town (镇)

- Tuoputiereke (托普铁热克镇) | Jimunai (吉木乃镇)

Township (乡)

- Tuoputiereke Township (托普铁热克乡) | Tuosite Township (托斯特乡) | Qialeshihai Township (恰勒什海乡) | Kaerjiao Township (喀尔交乡) | Biesitiereke Township (别斯铁热克乡)

Others

- 兵团186团

== Bayingolin Mongol Autonomous Prefecture ==
=== Korla City ===
Subdistrict (街道)

- Tuanjie (团结街道) | Sayibage Subdistrict (萨依巴格街道) | Tianshan Subdistrict (天山街道) | Xincheng Subdistrict (新城街道) | Jianshe Road Subdistrict (建设路街道)

Town (镇)

- Shanghu (上户镇) | Tashidian, Xinier (西尼尔镇)

Township (乡)

- Tiekeqi Township (铁克其乡) | Qiaerbage Township (恰尔巴格乡) | Yingxia Township (英下乡) | Langan Township (兰干乡) | Heshilike Township (和什力克乡) | Halayugong Township (哈拉玉宫乡) | Awati Township (阿瓦提乡) | Tuouliqi Township (托布力其乡) | Puhui Township (普惠乡)

Others

- 库尔楚园艺场 | 包头湖农场 | 普惠农场 | 阿瓦提农场 | 沙依东园艺场 | 兵团农二师（师部 | 28团场 | 29团场 | 30团场）

=== Luntai County ===
Town (镇)

- Luntai Town (轮台镇) | Lunnan (轮南镇) | Qunbake (群巴克镇) | Yanxia (阳霞镇 )

Township (乡)

- Haerbake Township (哈尔巴克乡) | Yeyungou Township (野云沟乡) | Akesalai Township (阿克萨来乡) | Taerlake Township (塔尔拉克乡) | Caohu Township (草湖乡) | Tierekebaza Township (铁热克巴扎乡) | Cedaya Township (策大雅乡)

=== Yuli County ===
Towns (镇)

- Yuli Town (尉犁镇), Xingping Town (兴平镇, formerly 兴平乡), Tuanjie Town (团结镇, formerly 团结乡)

Township (乡)

- Talimu Township (塔里木乡), Dunkuotan Township (墩阔坦乡), Ka'erquga Township (喀尔曲尕乡), Akesupu Township (Akesufu; 阿克苏普乡/阿克苏甫乡), Gulebage Township (古勒巴格乡)

Others

- 兵团团场: 31团场, 32团场, 33团场, 34团场, 35团场

=== Ruoqiang County ===
Towns (镇)

- Ruoqiang Town (若羌镇), Qilanbulak (Yitunbulake; 依吞布拉克镇), Luobupo (罗布泊镇), Tieganlike Township (铁干里克镇), Waxxari (Washixia; 瓦石峡镇)

Townships (乡)

- Wutamu Township (吾塔木乡), Tomorlog Township (Tiemulike; 铁木里克乡), Qimantag Township (祁曼塔格乡)

Others

- 兵团36团场

=== Qiemo County ===
Towns (镇)

- Qiemo Town (且末镇), Tatrang (Tatirang; 塔提让镇), Aqqan (Aqiang; 阿羌镇), Aoyiya Yilake (奥依亚依拉克镇), Tazhong (塔中镇), Aral Township (Arele; 阿热勒镇)

Townships (乡)

- Qiongkule Township (琼库勒乡), Tuogela Keleke Township (托格拉克勒克乡), Bage Airike Township (Bage'airike; 巴格艾日克乡), Yengiostang Township (Yingwusitang; 英吾斯塘乡), Aketi Kandun Township (Aketikandun; 阿克提坎墩乡), Kuoshi Satema Township (Kuoshisatema; 阔什萨特玛乡), Koramlik Township (Kula Muleke; 库拉木勒克乡),

County Autonomous Regions (县辖区)

- Aqiang District (阿羌区)

Others

- 农二师且末工程支队

=== Hejing County ===
Town (镇)

- Hejing Town (和静镇) | Baluntai (巴仑台镇) | Barunhaermodun (巴润哈尔莫墩镇) | Haermodun (哈尔莫墩镇)

Township (乡)

- Naimenmodun Township (乃门莫墩乡) | Xiebinaierbuhu Township (协比乃尔布呼乡) | Keerguti Township (克尔古提乡) | Alagou Township (阿拉沟乡) | Elezaitewulu Township (额勒再特乌鲁乡) | Bayinguoleng Township (巴音郭愣乡) | Bayinwulu Township (巴音乌鲁乡) | Gongnaisigou Township (巩乃斯沟乡)

Others

- 乌拉斯台农场 | 和静县钢铁厂 | 兵团（21团场 | 22团场 | 23团场 | 223团场） | 农二师湖光糖厂

=== Hoxud County ===
Town (镇 )

- Tewulike (特吾里克镇)

Township (乡)

- Quhui Township (曲惠乡) | Tahaqi Township (塔哈其乡) | Suhate Township (苏哈特乡) | Nairenkeer Township (乃仁克尔乡)

Ethnic Township (民族乡)

- Wushitala Hui Ethnic Township (乌什塔拉回族乡)

Others

- Qingshuihe Farm (清水河农场) | Baoertu Ranch (包尔图牧场) |Malan Public Security Controlled Area (马兰公安管区) | 兵团（24团场 | 26团场）

=== Bohu County ===
Town (镇)

- Bohu Town (博湖镇) | Benbutu (本布图镇)

Township (乡)

- Tawenjueken Township (塔温觉肯乡) | Wulanzaigesen Township (乌兰再格森乡) | Caikannuoer Township (才坎诺尔乡) | Chagannuoer Township (查干诺尔乡) | Bositenghu Township (博斯腾湖乡)

Others

- 兵团25团场

=== Yanqi Hui Autonomous County ===
Towns:

- Yanqi Town (焉耆镇), Qigxin, Yongning (永宁镇), Sishilichengzi (四十里城子镇)

Townships:

- Beidaqu Township (北大渠乡), Wuhaoqu Township (五号渠乡), Qagan Qehe Township (查汗采开乡), Borhoi Township (包尔海乡)

== Bortala Mongol Autonomous Prefecture ==
=== Bole City ===
Subdistrict (街道)

- Qingdeli Subdistrict (青得里街道) | Gulimutu Subdistrict (顾力木图街道) | Keergenzhuo Subdistrict (克尔根卓街道) | Santai Subdistrict (三台街道)

Town (镇)

- Xiaoyingpan Town (小营盘镇) | Dalete Town (达勒特镇) | Wutubulage Town (乌图布拉格镇)

Township (乡)

- Qingdeli Township (青得里乡) | Balinharimodun Township (贝林哈日莫墩乡)

Others

- 阿拉山口口岸行政管理区 | 阿热勒托海牧场 | 兵团农五师（81团 | 84团 | 85团 | 86团 | 89团 | 90团） | 香班哈日根牧场

=== Jinghe County ===
Town (镇)

- Jinghe Town (Jing) (精河镇, جىڭ) | Daheyan Town (Dakheyangzi) (大河沿子镇, داخېيەڭزى)

Township (乡)

- Mangding Township (Mandanbulaq) (茫丁乡, ماندانبۇلاق) | Tuoli Township (Toli) (托里乡, تولى) | Tuotuo Township (Todog) (托托乡, تودوگ)

Others

- 阿合其农场 | 八家户农场 | 兵团82团 | 兵团83团 | 兵团91团 | 古尔图牧场

=== Wenquan County ===
Town (镇)

- Bogedaer (博格达尔镇) | Haribuhu (哈日布呼镇)

Townships (乡)

- Agelige Township (安格里格乡) | Chagantunge Township (查干屯格乡) | Zalemute Township (扎勒木特乡) | Taxiu Township (塔秀乡)

Others

- Huhetuoha Breeding Ranch (呼和托哈种畜场) | Kundelun (昆得仑牧场) | 兵团87团 | 兵团88团 | Mengke Ranch (孟克牧场)

== Changji Hui Autonomous Prefecture ==
=== Changji City ===
Subdistrict (街道)

- Yan'an North Road Subdistrict (延安北路街道), Beijing South Road Subdistrict (北京南路街道), Luzhou Road Subdistrict (绿洲路街道), Zhongshan Road Subdistrict (中山路街道), Ningbian Road Subdistrict (宁边路街道), Jianguo Road Subdistrict(建国路街道)

Town (镇)

- Liuhuanggou Town (硫磺沟镇) | Sanjiang Town (三工镇) | Yushugou Town (榆树沟镇) | Liujiang Town (六工镇) | Erliugong Town (二六工镇, ئەرليۇگۇڭ) | Daxiqu Town (大西渠镇)

Township (乡)

- Dianba Township (佃坝乡) | Binghu Township, Changji (滨湖乡) | Miaoergou Township (庙尔沟乡)

Ethnic Township (民族乡)

- Ashili Kazakh Ethnic Township (阿什里哈萨克族乡, ئاشىلى)

Others

- 园艺场 | 共青团农场 | 军户农场 | 下巴湖农场 | 老农河农区 | 林木种苗场 | 良种场 | 水利厅水土改良实验场 | 商务厅农场 | 兵团农六师（师部驻地 | 101团 | 103团）

=== Fukang City ===
Subdistrict (街道)

- Bofeng Street Subdistrict (博峰街街道) | Fuxin Street Subdistrict (阜新街街道) | Zhundong Subdistrict (准东街道)

Town (镇)

- Ganhezi (甘河子镇) | Chengguan (城关镇) | Jiuyun Street Town (九运街镇)| Ziniquanzi Town (滋泥泉子镇)

Township (乡)

- Shuimogou Township (水磨沟乡)

Ethnic Township (民族乡)

- Sangonghe Kazakh Ethnic Township (三工河哈萨克族乡) | Shanghugou Kazakh Ethnic Township (上户沟哈萨克族乡)

Other (其他)

- 准东石油勘探开发公司 | 阜康市有色管理处 | 阜康市种羊场 | 小泉牧场 | 五宫煤矿 | 农六师土墩子农场 | 六运湖农场 | 兵团222团场

=== Hutubi County ===
Town (镇)

- Hutubi Town (呼图壁镇, قۇتۇبى) | Dafeng Town (大丰镇, دافېڭ) | Qiaoergou Town (雀尔沟镇) | Nianlidian Town (廿里店镇) | Yunhucun Town (园户村镇) | Wugongtai Town (五工台镇, ۋۇگوڭتەي)

Ethnic Township (民族乡)

- Shitizi Kazakh Ethnic Township (石梯子哈萨克民族乡) | Dushanzi Kazakh Ethnic Township (独山子哈萨克族乡)

Other (其他)

- 南山牧场 | 良种繁育场 | 干河子林场 | 塔勒得牧场 | 林场 | 种牛场 | 种畜场 | 兵团105团 | 兵团106团 | 兵团111团 | 农六师芳草湖总场

=== Manas County ===
Town (镇)

- Manas Town (玛纳斯镇) | Leduyi Town (乐土驿镇) | Baojiadian Town (包家店镇) | Liangzhouhu Town (凉州户镇) | Beiwucha Town (北五岔镇) | Liuhudi Town (六户地镇) | Lanzhou Bay Town (兰州湾镇)

Township (乡)

- Guangdongdi Township (广东地乡)

Ethnic Townships (民族乡)

- Qingshuihe Kazakh Ethnic Township清水河哈萨克族乡) | Taxihe Kazakh Ethnic Township (塔西河哈萨克族乡) | Hankkazitan Kazakh Ethnic Township (旱卡子滩哈萨克族乡)

Other (其他)

- 玛纳斯发电有限责任公司 | 玛纳斯园艺场 | 玛纳斯平原林场 | 农科院玛纳斯试验站 | 农六师新湖农场 | 兵团农八师（147团场 | 148团场 | 149团场 | 150团场）

=== Qitai County ===
Town (镇 )

- Qitai Town (奇台镇), Laoqitai Town 老奇台镇 | Banjiegou Town (半截沟镇) | Jibuku Town (吉布库镇) | Dongwan Town (东湾镇) | Xidi Town (西地镇)

Township (乡)

- Biliuhe Township (碧流河乡) | Xibeiwan Township (西北湾乡) | Kanerzi Township (坎尔孜乡) | Jicheng Township (古城乡) | Qihu Township (七户乡) | Sangezhuangzi Township (三个庄子乡)

Ethnic Townships (民族乡)

- Wumachang Kazakh Ethnic Township (五马场哈萨克族乡) | Qiaoren Kazakh Ethnic Township (乔仁哈萨克族乡) | Daquan Tatar Ethnic Township (大泉塔塔尔族乡)

Other (其他)

- 兵团农六师（108团 | 109团 | 110团 | 奇台农场 | 北塔山牧场）

=== Jimsar County ===
镇

- Jimsar Town (吉木萨尔镇) | Santai Town (三台镇) | Quanzi Street Town (泉子街镇) | Beiting Town (北庭镇)

乡

- Ergong Township (二工乡) | Qingyang Lake Township (庆阳湖乡) | Laotai Township (老台乡) | Dayou Township (大有乡) | Xindi Township (新地乡)

其他

- 兵团农六师（红旗农场 | 107团）

=== Mori Kazakh Autonomous County ===
Town (镇)

- Mori Town (木垒镇) | Xijier Town (西吉尔镇) | Dongcheng Town (东城镇)

Township (乡)

- Yinggebao Township (英格堡乡) | Zhaobishan Township (照壁山乡) | Xinhu Township (新户乡) | Qiaoren Township (雀仁乡) | Baiyanghe Township (白杨河乡) | Dashitou Township (大石头乡) | Bositan Township (博斯坦乡)

Ethnic Township (民族乡)

- Danangou Uzbek Ethnic Township (大南沟乌孜别克族乡)

Other (其他)

- 良种场 | 克热克库都克牧场

== Hami Prefecture ==
=== Kumul City ===
Subdistrict (街道)

- Donghequ Subdistrict (东河区街道) | Xihequ Subdistrict (西河区街道) | Xinshiqu Subdistrict (新市区街道)| Liyuan Subdistrict (丽园街道) | Shiyouxincheng Subdistrict (石油新城街道)

Town (镇)

- Yamansu Town (雅满苏镇) | Xingxingxia Town (星星峡镇, شىڭشىڭشيا بازىرى) | Erpu Town (Astana) (二堡镇, ئاستانە بازىرى)| Qijuejing Town (Yatta Quduq) (七角井镇, يەتتە قۇدۇق بازىرى)

Township (乡)

- Qincheng Township (沁城乡)| Wulatai Kazakh Township (Olatay) (乌拉台哈萨克乡, ئۇلاتاي قازاق يېزىسى) | Shuangjingzi Township (双井子乡)| Daquanwan Township (Bulung Toghraq) (大泉湾乡, بۇلۇڭ توغراق يېزىسى)| Dewaidurukeske Township (Dawalduruk) (德外都如克萨克乡, دەۋەلدۈرۈك يېزىسى) | Taojiagong Township (陶家宫乡)| Huicheng Township (回城乡)| Huayuan Township (花园乡) | Nanhu Township (南湖乡)| Wubao Township (五堡乡)| Xishan Township (Shishan) (西山乡, شىشەن يېزىسى) | Tianshan Township (天山乡)| Baishitou Township (白石头乡)| Chengjiao Township (城郊乡) | Liushugou Township (柳树沟乡)

=== Yiwu County ===
Town (镇)

- Yiwu Town (伊吾镇) | Naomaohu Town (淖毛湖镇)

Township (乡)

- Weizixia Township (苇子峡乡) | Xiamaya Township (下马崖乡) | Yanchi Township (盐池乡) | Tuhulu Township (吐葫芦乡)

Ethnic Township (民族乡)

- Qianshan Kazakh Ethnic Township (前山哈萨克族乡)

Other (其他)

- 兵团淖毛湖农场

=== Barkol Kazakh Autonomous County ===
Town (镇)

- Balikun Town (巴里坤镇) | Boerqiangji Town (博尔羌吉镇) | Dahe Town (大河镇) | Kuisu Town (奎苏镇)

Township (乡)

- Saerqiaoke Township (萨尔乔克乡) | Haiziyan Township (海子沿乡) | Xialaoba Township (下涝坝乡) | Shirenzi Township (石人子乡) | Huayuan Township (花园乡) | Santanghu Township (三塘湖乡) | Dahongliuxia Township (大红柳峡乡) | Baqiangzi Township (八墙子乡)

Other (其他)

- 兵团红山农场 | 兵团淖毛湖农场 | 红星一牧场良种繁育场

== Hotan Prefecture ==
=== Hotan City ===
The city includes three subdistricts, three towns, five townships and two other areas:

Subdistricts:

- Nurbag Subdistrict (Nu'erbage; 努尔巴格街道), Gujanbagh Subdistrict (Gujiangbage; 古江巴格街道), Gulbagh Subdistrict (Gulebage; 古勒巴格街道), Na'erbage Subdistrict (纳尔巴格街道),

Towns:

- Laskuy (Lasikui; لاسكۇي بازىرى / 拉斯奎镇), Yurungqash (Yulongkashi; يۇرۇڭقاش بازىرى / 玉龙喀什镇), Tusalla (Tushala; بازىرى تۇساللا / 吐沙拉镇)

Townships:

- Shorbagh Township (Xiao'erbage; شورباغ يېزىسى / 肖尔巴格乡), Ilchi Township (Yiliqi; ئىلچى يېزىسى / 伊里其乡), Gujanbagh Township (Gujiangbage; گۇجانباغ يېزىسى / 古江巴格乡), Jiya Township (جىيا يېزىسى / 吉亚乡), Aqchal Township (Akeqiale ئاقچال يېزىسى / 阿克恰勒乡)

Others:

- Beijing Industrial Park (北京工业园区), Hotan City Jinghe Logistics Park (和田市京和物流园区)

=== Hotan County ===
Two towns:

- Baghchi (Bageqi; باغچى بازىرى / 巴格其镇), Hanerik (Han'airike, Khaneriq; خانئېرىق بازىرى / 罕艾日克镇)

Ten townships:

- Yengiawat (Ying'awati; يېڭىئاۋات يېزىسى / 英阿瓦提乡), Yengierik (Ying'airike; يېڭىئېرىق يېزىسى / 英艾日克乡), Buzaq (Buzhake; بۇزاق يېزىسى / 布扎克乡), Layka (Layika, Layqa; لايقا يېزىسى / 拉依喀乡), Langru (لاڭرۇ يېزىسى / 朗如乡), Tewekkul (Tawakule; تەۋەككۈل يېزىسى / 塔瓦库勒乡), Islamawat (Yisilamu'awati; ئىسلامئاۋات يېزىسى / 伊斯拉木阿瓦提乡), Seghizkol (Segezi Kule; سېغىزكۆل يېزىسى / 色格孜库勒乡), Qashteshi (Kashitashi; قاشتېشى يېزىسى / 喀什塔什乡), Uzunsho (Wuzongxiao; ئۇزۇنشو يېزىسى / 吾宗肖乡)

One other area:

- Hotan County Economic New Area (和田县经济新区)

=== Karakax/Moyu County ===
Towns:

- Karakax (Kalakashi; قاراقاش بازىرى / 喀拉喀什镇), Zawa (Zhawa; زاۋا بازىرى / 扎瓦镇), Kuya (Kuiya; كۇيا بازىرى / 奎牙镇), Qarasaz (Ka'ersai; قاراساي بازىرى / 喀尔赛镇), Purchaqchi (Puqiakeqi; پۇرچاقچى بازىرى / 普恰克其镇, formerly پۇرچاقچى يېزىسى / 普恰克其乡)

Townships:

- Aqsaray (Akesalayi; ئاقساراي يېزىسى / 阿克萨拉依乡), Urchi (Wu'erqi; ئۇرچى يېزىسى / 乌尔其乡), Tohula (Tuohula, Tuxula;توخۇلا يېزىسى / 托胡拉乡), Saybag (Sayibage, Saywagh; سايباغ يېزىسى / 萨依巴格乡), Jahanbagh (Jiahan Bage; جاھانباغ يېزىسى / 加汗巴格乡), Manglay (Manglai; ماڭلاي يېزىسى / 芒来乡), Qochi (Kuoyiqi; قوچى يېزىسى / 阔依其乡), Yawa (ياۋا يېزىسى / 雅瓦乡), Tüwat (Tuwaite, Tüwet; تۈۋەت يېزىسى / 吐外特乡), Yéngiyer (Yingye'er; يېڭىيەر يېزىسى / 英也尔乡), Kawak (Kawake; كاۋاك يېزىسى / 喀瓦克乡)

Other areas:

- Regiment 417 (兵团四十七团), Regiment 224 (兵团二二四团)

=== Yutian/Keriya County ===
Two towns:

- Keriya Town (Mugala; مۇغاللا بازىرى / 木尕拉镇), Xambabazar (Xianbai Bazha; شەنبە بازار بازىرى / 先拜巴扎镇)

Thirteen townships:

- Jay (Jiayi; جاي يېزىسى / 加依乡), Kokyar (Kekeya; كۆكيار يېزىسى / 科克亚乡), Aral (Arele; ئارال يېزىسى / 阿热勒乡), Arix (Arixi; نىيە يېزىسى / 阿日希乡), Bogazlanggar (Langan; لەڭگەر يېزىسى / 兰干乡), Siyek (Siyeke; سىيەك يېزىسى / 斯也克乡), Tagdaxman (Tuogeri Gazi; توغراغاز يېزىسى / 托格日尕孜乡), Karaki (Kalake'er, Qarqi; قارقى يېزىسى / 喀拉克尔乡), Oytograk (Aoyituo Gelake, Oytoghraq; ئويتوغراق يېزىسى / 奥依托格拉克乡), Aqqan (Aqiang, Achchan; ئاچچان يېزىسى / 阿羌乡), Yengibag (Yingbage; يېڭىباغ يېزىسى / 英巴格乡), Shiwol (Xiwule; شىۋول يېزىسى / 希吾勒乡), Darya Boyi (Daliya Buyi, Deryaboyi; دەريا بويى يېزىسى / 达里雅布依乡)

Others:

- National (Kunlun) Sheep Farm (国营（昆仑）种羊场), Yutian Prison (于田监狱), Regiment 225 (兵团二二五团)

=== Lop/Luopu County ===
One subdistrict:

- Chengqu Subdistrict (城区街道)

Three towns:

- Lop (Luopu; لوپ بازىرى / 洛浦镇), Sampul (Shanpulu; سامپۇل بازىرى / 山普鲁镇), Hanggiya (Hanggui; ھاڭگىيا بازىرى / 杭桂镇)

Six townships:

- Buya (بۇيا يېزىسى / 布亚乡), Charbagh (Qia'erbage; چارباغ يېزىسى / 恰尔巴格乡), Dol (Duolu; دول يېزىسى / 多鲁乡), Nawa (ناۋا يېزىسى / 纳瓦乡), Beshtoghraq (Baishi Tuogelake; بەشتوغراق يېزىسى / 拜什托格拉克乡), Aqqik (Aqike, Achchiq; ئاچچىق يېزىسى / 阿其克乡)

Three others areas:

- Seed Farm (良种场), Lop County Beijing Agricultural Science and Technology Demonstration Park Area (洛浦县北京农业科技示范园区), Lop County Beijing Industry Park (洛浦县北京工业园区)

=== Minfeng/Niya County ===
Town:

- Niya Town (Niye; نىيە بازىرى / 尼雅镇)

Townships:

- Niye (Niya; نىيە يېزىسى / 尼雅乡), Rokiya (Ruokeya, Rukiya; رۇكىيا يېزىسى / 若克雅乡), Salgozak (Salewuzeke, Salghozek; سالغوزەك يېزىسى / 萨勒吾则克乡), Yeyik (Yeyike, Yëyiq, Ya-li-ka, Yeh-i-k'o; يېيىق يېزىسى / 叶亦克乡), Andir (Andi'er, Endir; ئەندىر يېزىسى / 安迪尔乡), Yawatongguz (Yawatongguzi, Yawa Tongguz; ياۋا توڭگۇز يېزىسى / 亚瓦通古孜乡)

=== Pishan/Guma County ===
Subdistrict:

- Pishan County Subdistrict (皮山县街道)

Towns:

- Guma (گۇما بازىرى / 固玛镇), Duwa (دۇۋا بازىرى / 杜瓦镇), Xaidulla (Saitula, Sheydulla; شەيدۇللا بازىرى / 赛图拉镇), Muji (مۇجى بازىرى / 木吉镇), Koxtag (Kuoshitage, Qoshtagh; قوشتاغ بازىرى / 阔什塔格镇), Sanju (Sangzhu; سانجۇ بازىرى / 桑株镇)

Townships:

- Kiliyang (Keliyang; كىلىياڭ يېزىسى / 克里阳乡), Kokterak (Keketiereke, Köktërek; كۆكتېرەك يېزىسى / 科克铁热克乡), Choda (Qiaoda; چودا يېزىسى / 乔达乡), Mokoyla (Mukuila; موكويلا يېزىسى / 木奎拉乡), Zangguy (Canggui; زاڭگۇي يېزىسى / 藏桂乡), Piyalma (Piyalema; پىيالما يېزىسى / 皮亚勒玛乡), Pixna (Pixina, Pishna; پىشنا يېزىسى / 皮西那乡), Bashlengger (Bashilangan; باشلەڭگەر يېزىسى / 巴什兰干乡), Nawabat Tajik Township (Nao'abati; ناۋئابات تاجىك يېزىسى / 垴阿巴提塔吉克民族乡), Kangkir Kyrgyz Township (Kangke'er, Kengqir; كەڭقىر قىرغىز يېزىسى / 康克尔柯尔克孜民族乡)

Others:

- Pishan Sanxia Industrial Park (皮山三峡工业园区), Pishan Regiment Farm (兵团皮山农场)

=== Qira County ===
Towns:

- Qira (Cele, Chira; چىرا بازىرى / 策勒镇), Gulakhma (Gulahama; گۇلاخما بازىرى / 固拉哈玛镇)

Townships:

- Qira (Cele, Chira; چىرا يېزىسى / 策勒乡), Damiku (Damagou; دامىكۇ يېزىسى / 达玛沟乡), Qaka (Qiaha, Chaqa; چاقا يېزىسى / 恰哈乡), Ulughsay (Wulukesayi; ئۇلۇغساي يېزىسى / 乌鲁克萨依乡), Nur (Nu'er, Nuri; نۇرى يېزىسى / 奴尔乡), Bostan (Bositan; بوستان يېزىسى / 博斯坦乡)

== Ili Kazakh Autonomous Prefecture ==
=== Yining City ===
Subdistrict (街道)

- Sayibuyi Subdistrict(萨依布依街道)|Dunmaili Subdistrict(墩买里街道)|Yili He Lu Subdistrict(伊犁河路街道)|Kazanqi Subdistrict(喀赞其街道)|Doulaitibage Subdistrict(都来提巴格街道)|Qiongkeruike Subdistrict(琼科瑞克街道)|Ailanmubage Subdistrict(艾兰木巴格街道)|Jiefang Lu Subdistrict(解放路街道)

=== Kuitun City ===
Subdistrict (街道)

- Tuanjie Road Subdistrict (团结路街道) | Ürümqi East Road Subdistrict (乌鲁木齐东路街道) | Beijing Road Subdistrict (北京路街道) | Ürümqi West Road Subdistrict (乌鲁木齐西路街道) | Train Station Subdistrict (火车站街道)

Town (乡)

- Kanganqi Township (开干齐乡)

Others

- 兵团131团

=== Yining County ===
Town (镇 )

- Jiliyuzi (吉里于孜镇) | Dunmaza (墩麻扎镇)

Township (乡)

- Hudiyayuzi Township (胡地亚于孜乡) | Tulupanyuzi Township (吐鲁番于孜乡) | Kalayagaqi Township (喀拉亚尕奇乡) | Arewusitang Township (阿热吾斯塘乡) | Yingtamu Township (英塔木乡) | Bayituohai Township (巴依托海乡) | Weiwueryuqiwen Township (维吾尔玉其温乡) | Samuyuzi Township (萨木于孜乡) | Kashi Township (喀什乡) | Maza Township (麻扎乡) | Wenyaer Township (温亚尔乡) | Awuliya Township (阿乌利亚乡) | Quluhai Township (曲鲁海乡) | Wugong Township (武功乡) | Sadikeyuzi Township (萨地克于孜乡)

Ethnic Township (民族乡)

- Yuqunwen Hui Ethnic Township (愉群翁回族乡)

Others

- Qingnian Farm (青年农场) |Duolang Farm (多浪农场) | 农四师（兵团70团 | Baishidun Farm (拜什墩农场）)

=== Huocheng County ===
Town (镇)

- Shuiding Town (水定镇) | Qingshuihe Town (Chingsikhoza) (清水河镇, چىڭسىخوزا) | Lucaogou Town (Losigung) (芦草沟镇, لوسىگۇڭ) | Huiyuan Town (惠远镇) | Saerbulake Town (萨尔布拉克镇)

Town (乡)

- Langan Township (兰干乡) | Sandaohe Township (三道河乡) | Sangong Hui Ethnic Township (三宫回族乡) | Daxigou Township (Dashigu) (大西沟乡, داشىگۇ)

Ethnic Township (民族乡)

- Yichegashan Xibo Ethnic Township (Yichegashan) (伊车嘎善锡伯族乡, يىچېگاشەن)

Other (其他)

- 格干沟牧场 | 莫乎尔牧场 | 果子沟牧场 | 霍城县良种繁育场 | 霍尔果斯海关口岸 | 兵团61团 | 兵团62团 | 兵团63团 | 兵团64团 | 兵团65团 | 兵团66团

=== Tokkuztara County ===
Town (镇)

- Tokkuztara Town (巩留镇)

Township (乡)

- Mohuer Township (莫乎尔乡) | Jiergelang Township (吉尔格郎乡) |Agaersen Township (阿尕尔森乡) | Dongmaili Township (东买里乡) | Tasituobie Township (塔斯托别乡) | Tikeareke Township (提克阿热克乡) | Aketubieke Township (阿克吐别克乡)

Other (其他)

- 巩留县综合农场 | 阔什阿朵什羊场 | 巩留县牛场 | 良凡场 | 恰西鹿场 | 巩留县林场 | 莫乎尔农场 | 巩留县核桃林场 | 兵团73团

=== Künes County ===
Town (镇)

- Künes Town (新源镇) |Areletuobie Town ( 阿热勒托别镇) | Talede Town (塔勒德镇) | Nalati Town (那拉提镇) | Xiaoerbulake Town (肖尔布拉克镇)

Township (乡)

- Kansu Township (坎苏乡) | Kalabula Township (喀拉布拉乡) | Alemale Township (阿勒玛勒乡) | Tuergen Township (吐尔根乡)

Other (其他)

- 巩乃斯种羊场 | 兵团71团 | 兵团72团

=== Zhaosu County ===
Town (镇)

- Zhaosu Town (昭苏镇)

Township (乡)

- Hongnahai Township (洪纳海乡) | Wuzunbulake Township (乌尊布拉克乡) | Akedala Township (阿克达拉乡) | Saerkuobu Township (萨尔阔布乡) | Kaxiajiaer Township (喀夏加尔乡) | Kalasu Township (喀拉苏乡)

Ethnic Township (民族乡)

- Chahanwusu Mongol Ethnic Township (察汗乌苏蒙古族乡) | Xiate Krghiz Ethnic Township (夏特柯尔克孜族乡) | Husongtukaerxun Mongol Ethnic Township (胡松图喀尔逊蒙古族乡)

Other (其他)

- Zhongyang Ranch (种羊场) | 阿合牙孜牧场 | 种马场 | 天山西部林业局昭苏林场 | 军马场 | 煤矿 | 农四师（74团 | 75团 | 76团 | 77团

=== Tekes County ===
Town (镇 )

- Tekes Town (特克斯镇)

Township (乡)

- Kekesu Township (科克苏乡) | Qilewuzeke Township (齐勒乌泽克乡) | Qilaketiereke Township (乔拉克铁热克乡) | Kaladala Township (喀拉达拉乡) | Kalatuohai Township (喀拉托海乡)

Ethnic Township (民族乡)

- Hujierte Mongol Ethnic Township (呼吉尔特蒙古族乡) | Kuoketiereke Kyrghiz Ethnic Township (阔克铁热克柯尔克孜族乡)

Other (其他)

- 托斯曼牧场 | 萨尔阔布牧场 | 克孜勒布拉克牧场 | 喀拉达拉牧场 | 特克斯军马场 | 科克苏林场 | 农四师78团

=== Nilka County ===
Town (镇)

- Nilka Town (尼勒克镇)

Township (乡)

- Subutai Township (苏布台乡) | Kalasu Township (喀拉苏乡) | Jiahawulasitai Township (加哈乌拉斯台乡) | Nilka Wuzan Township (尼勒克乌赞乡) | Wulasitai Township (乌拉斯台乡) | Keling Township (克令乡) | Kalatuobie Township (喀拉托别乡) | Hujiertai Township (胡吉尔台乡) | Musi Township (木斯乡)

Ethnic Township (民族乡)

- 科克浩特浩尔蒙古族乡

Others

- 阿克塔斯牧场 | 良种繁育场 | 军马场 | 林场 | 种蜂场 | 兵团79团

=== Qapqal Xibe Autonomous County ===
Town (镇)

- Qapqal Town (察布查尔镇) | Aixinsheli Town (爱新舍里镇)

Township (乡)

- Duiqiniulu Township (堆齐牛录乡) | Sunzaqiniulu Township (孙扎齐牛录乡) | Chaohuoer Township (绰霍尔乡) | Nadaqiniulu Township (纳达齐牛录乡) | Zakuqiniulu Township (扎库齐牛录乡) | Kan Township (坎乡) | Kuohongqi Township (阔洪奇乡) | Hainuke Township (海努克乡) | Jiagasitai Township (加尕斯台乡) | Qiongbola Township (琼博拉乡)

Ethnic Township (民族乡)

- Miliangquan Hui Ethnic Township (米粮泉回族乡)

Others

- 良种繁育场 | 奶牛场 | 平原林场 | 山区林场 | 兵团67团 | 兵团68团 | 兵团69团

== Kashgar Prefecture ==
=== Kashgar City ===
Subdistricts (باشقارمىسى / 街道)

- Chasa Subdistrict (Qiasa; چاسا كوچا باشقارمىسى / 恰萨街道), Yawagh Subdistrict (Yawage; ياۋاغ كوچا باشقارمىسى / 亚瓦格街道), Östeng Boyi Subdistrict (Wusitangboyi; ئۆستەڭ بويى كوچا باشقارمىسى / 吾斯塘博依街道), Qum Derwaza Subdistrict (Kumudai'erwazha; قۇم دەرۋازا كوچا باشقارمىسى / 库木代尔瓦扎街道), Gherbiz Yurt Avenue Subdistrict (Xiyu Dadao; غەربىي يۇرت يولى كوچا باشقارمىسى / 西域大道街道), Sherqiy Köl Subdistrict (Donghu; شەرقىي كۆل كوچا باشقارمىسى / 东湖街道), Merhaba Avenue Subdistrict (Yingbin Dadao; مەرھابا يولى كوچا باشقارمىسى / 迎宾大道街道), Gherbiz Baghcha Subdistrict (Xigongyuan; غەربىي باغچا كوچا باشقارمىسى / 西公园街道)

Towns (بازىرى / 镇)

- Nezerbagh (Naize'erbage; نەزەرباغ بازىرى / 乃则尔巴格镇; formerly 乃则尔巴格乡), Shamalbagh (Xiamalebage; شامالباغ بازىرى / 夏马勒巴格镇; formerly 夏马勒巴格乡)

Townships (يېزىسى / 乡)

- Döletbagh Township (Duolaitebage; دۆلەتباغ يېزىسى / 多来特巴格乡), Qoghan Township (Haohan; قوغان يېزىسى / 浩罕乡), Semen Township (Seman; سەمەن يېزىسى / 色满乡), Xangdi Township (Huangdi; خاڭدى يېزىسى / 荒地乡), Beshkërem Township (Baishikeranmu; بەشكېرەم يېزىسى / 伯什克然木乡), Paxtekle Township (Pahataikeli; پاختەكلە يېزىسى / 帕哈太克里乡), Awat Township (Awati; ئاۋات يېزىسى / 阿瓦提乡), Yëngi'östeng Township (Yingwusitan; يېڭىئۆستەڭ يېزىسى / 英吾斯坦乡), Aqqash Township (Akekashi; ئاققاش يېزىسى / 阿克喀什乡)

=== Shufu County ===
Towns (بازىرى / 镇)

- Toqquzaq (Tuokezhake; توققۇزاق بازىرى / 托克扎克镇), Lengger (Langan; لەڭگەر بازىرى / 兰干镇), Oghusaq (Wukusake; ئوغۇساق بازىرى / 吾库萨克镇), Opal (Wupa'er; ئوپال بازىرى / 乌帕尔镇)

Townships (يېزىسى / 乡)

- Tashmiliq Township (Tashimilike; تاشمىلىق يېزىسى / 塔什米里克乡), Tërim Township (Tierimu; تېرىم يېزىسى / 铁日木乡), Bulaqsu Township (Bulakesu; بۇلاقسۇ يېزىسى / 布拉克苏乡), Saybagh Township (Sayibage; سايباغ يېزىسى / 萨依巴格乡), Zemin Township (Zhanmin; زەمىن يېزىسى / 站敏乡), Mush Township (Mushi; مۇش يېزىسى / 木什乡)

Others

- 县种畜场, 县园艺场, 县林场, 县良种场, 疏附广州工业城

=== Shule County ===
Towns (بازىرى / 镇)

- Yengisheher Town (Shule; يېڭىشەھەر بازىرى / 疏勒镇, 英协海尔镇), Hanerik (Hannanlike; خانئېرىق بازىرى / 罕南力克镇), Yapchan (Yafuquan; ياپچان بازىرى / 牙甫泉镇)

Townships (يېزىسى / 乡)

- Barin Township (Baren; بارىن يېزىسى / 巴仁乡), Yanduma Township (Yandaman; ياندۇما يېزىسى / 洋大曼乡), Yamanyar Township (Yamanya; يامانيار يېزىسى / 亚曼牙乡), Baghchi Township (Baheqi; باغچى يېزىسى / 巴合齐乡), Tazghun Township (Tazihong; تازغۇن يېزىسى / 塔孜洪乡), Yengierik Township (Ying'erlike; يېڭىئېرىق يېزىسى / 英尔力克乡), Kumusherik Township (Kumuxilike; قۇمۇشئېرىق يېزىسى / 库木西力克乡), Tagharchi Township (Taga'erqi; تاغارچى يېزىسى / 塔尕尔其乡), Ermudun Township (Ai'ermudong; ئەرمۇدۇن يېزىسى / 艾尔木东乡), Aral Township (Alali; ئارال يېزىسى / 阿拉力乡), Harap Township (Alilafu; ھاراپ يېزىسى / 阿拉甫乡), Yengiawat Township (Yingawati; يېڭىئاۋات يېزىسى / 英阿瓦提乡)

Others

- Linchang (林场)| Liangzhong Farm (良种场) | Zhongchu Farm (种畜场) | Yuanyi Fields (园艺场) | Canzhong Farm (蚕种场) | Shuichan Farm (水产场) | Fengchang 蜂场 | XPCC 41 base (兵团41团)

=== Yengisar County ===
Town (بازىرى / 镇)

- Yengisar Town (Yingjisha; يېڭىسار بازىرى / 英吉沙镇), Ulughchat Township (Wuqia; ئۇلۇغچات بازىرى / 乌恰镇, formerly 乌恰乡), Mangshin Township (Mangxin; 芒辛镇, formerly ماڭشىن يېزىسى / 芒辛乡)

Township (يېزىسى / 乡)

- Sheher Township (Chengguan; شەھەر يېزىسى / 城关乡), Cholpan Township (Qiaolepan; چولپان يېزىسى / 乔勒潘乡), Lompa Township (Longfu; لومپا يېزىسى / 龙甫乡), Siyitle Township (Setili; 色提力乡), Saghan Township (Sahan; 萨罕乡), Yengiyer Township (Yingye'er; 英也尔乡), Qizil Township (Kezile; قىزىل يېزىسى / 克孜勒乡), Topluq Township (Tuopuluke; توپلۇق يېزىسى / 托普鲁克乡), Soget Township (Sugaiti; سۆگەت يېزىسى / 苏盖提乡), Egus Township (Aigusi; ئەگۈس يېزىسى / 艾古斯乡), Egizyer Township (Yigeziye'er; ئېگىزيەر يېزىسى / 依格孜也尔乡)

Others

- Yengisar County Dongfeng Farm (英吉沙县东风农场)

=== Poskam / Zepu County ===
Towns (بازىرى / 镇)

- Poskam Town (Zepu; پوسكام بازىرى / 泽普镇), Küybag Town (Kuiyibage; كۈيباغ بازىرى / 奎依巴格镇)

Townships (يېزسى / 乡)

- Poskam Township (Bosikamu; پوسكام يېزسى / 波斯喀木乡), Zhima Township (Yima; ژىما يېزىسى / 依玛乡), Gülbagh Township (Gulebage; گۈلباغ يىزىسى / 古勒巴格乡), Seyli Township (Saili; سەيلى يىزىسى / 赛力乡), Ikkisu Township (Yikesu; ئىككىسۇ يىزىسى / 依克苏乡), Tughchi Township (Tuhuqi; تۇغچى يىزىسى / 图呼其乡), Aqtam Township (Aketamu; ئاقتام يىزىسى / 阿克塔木乡), Aykol Township (Ayikule, Ayköl; ئايكۆل يىزىسى / 阿依库勒乡), Küybag Township (Kuiyibage; كۈيباغ بازىرى / 奎依巴格乡), Buyluq Tajik Ethnic Township (Buyiluke; بۇيلۇق تاجىك مىللىي يىزىسى / 布依鲁克塔吉克族乡 / 布依鲁克塔吉克族民族乡), Tong'an Township (桐安乡)

County-controlled district (县辖区)

- Küybag District (奎依巴格区)

=== Shache County ===
County controlled District (县辖区)

- Tuomuwusitang District (托木吾斯塘区) | Yishikuli District (伊什库力区) | Wudalike District (乌达力克区) | Huoshilapu District (霍什拉甫区) | Awati District (阿瓦提区) | Ailixihu District (艾力西湖区) | Baishikante District (白什坎特区)

Town (镇)

- Shache Town (莎车镇) | Reke Town (热克镇) | Awati Town (阿瓦提镇) | Ailixihu Town (艾力西湖镇) | Huangdi Town (荒地镇) | Baishikante Town (白什坎特镇) | Yigaierqi Town (依盖尔其镇)

Township (乡)

- Gulepage Township (古勒巴格乡) | Tuomuwusitang Township (托木吾斯塘乡) | Yingyusitang Township (英吾斯塘乡) | Arele Township (阿热勒乡) | Qiaerbage Township (恰尔巴格乡) | Yishikuli Township (伊什库力乡) | Mixia Township (米夏乡) | Tagaersi Township (塔尕尔其乡) | Paikeqi Township (拍克其乡) | Wudalike Township (乌达力克乡) | Aersilanbage Township (阿尔斯兰巴格乡) | Yakaairike Township (亚喀艾日克乡) | Kaqun Township (喀群乡) | Huoshilapu Township (霍什拉甫乡) | Damusi Township (达木斯乡) | Alamaiti Township (阿拉买提乡) | Atuotibage Township (阿扎提巴格乡) | Kuoshiairike Township (阔什艾日克乡) | Dunbagexiang Township (墩巴格乡乡) | Bageawati Township (巴格阿瓦提乡) | Kalasu Township (喀拉苏乡)

Ethnic Townships (民族乡)

- 孜热甫夏提塔吉克族乡 Zerepshat Tajik township

Other (其他)

- 莎车农场 | 莎车县良种场 | 莎车县国营农场 | 喀什监狱

莎车县各县辖区管辖乡镇 Tuomuwusitang District (托木吾斯塘区)

- 古勒巴格乡 | 托木吾斯塘乡 | 英吾斯塘乡 | 阿热勒乡 | 恰尔巴格乡

Tuomuwusitang District (托木吾斯塘区)

- 伊什库力乡 | 米夏乡 | 塔尕尔其乡 | 拍克其乡

Wudalike District (乌达力克区)

- 热克镇 | 乌达力克乡 | 阿尔斯兰巴格乡 | 亚喀艾日克乡 | 孜热甫夏提塔吉克族乡

Huoshilafu District (霍什拉甫区)

- 喀群乡 | 霍什拉甫乡 | 达木斯乡

Awat District (阿瓦提区)

- Awat Town (阿瓦提镇) | Alamaiti Township (阿拉买提乡) | Azatibage Township (阿扎提巴格乡)

Aili West Lake District (艾力西湖区)

- Ailixihu Town (艾力西湖镇) | Huangdi Town (荒地镇) | Kuoshiairike Township (阔什艾日克乡) | Dunbage Township (墩巴格乡)

Baishikan Special District (白什坎特区)

- 白什坎特镇 | 依盖尔其镇 | 巴格阿瓦提乡 | 喀拉苏乡

=== Kargilik/Yecheng County ===
Town (بازىرى / 镇)

- Kargilik Town (Kageleke, Qaghiliq; قاغىلىق بازىرى / 喀格勒克镇), Charbagh Town (Qia'erbage; چارباغ بازىرى / 恰尔巴格镇), Ushsharbash Town (Wuxiabashi; ئۇششارباش بازىرى / 乌夏巴什镇; also Wuxiakebashi 乌夏克巴什镇)

Township (يېزىسى / 乡)

- Loq Township (Luoke; لوق يېزىسى / 洛克乡), Besheriq Township (Baxireke; بەشئېرىق يېزىسى / 伯西热克乡), Tetir Township (Tieti; تېتىر يېزىسى / 铁提乡), Chasa Meschit Township (Qiasameiqite; چاسا مەسچىت يېزىسى / 恰萨美其特乡), Tögichi Township (Tuguqi; تۆگىچى يېزىسى / 吐古其乡), Janggilieski Township (Jianggelesi; جاڭگىلىئەسكى يېزىسى / 江格勒斯乡), Jayterak Township (Jianongtileke, Janyterek; جايتېرەك يېزىسى / 加依提勒克乡), Barin Township (Baren; بارىن يېزىسى / 巴仁乡), Ghojaeriq Township (Wujireke; غوجائېرىق يېزىسى / 乌吉热克乡), Shaxap Township (Xiahefu; شاخاپ يېزىسى / 夏合甫乡), Yilqichi Township (Yilikeqi; يىلقىچى يېزىسى / 依力克其乡), Yitimliqum Township (Yitimukong; يىتىملىقۇم يېزىسى / 依提木孔乡), Zunglang Township (Zonglang; زۇڭلاڭ يېزىسى / 宗朗乡), Kokyar Township (Kekeya; كۆكيار يېزىسى / 柯克亚乡), Shixshu Township (Xihexiu; شىخشۇ يېزىسى / 西合休乡), Chipan Township (Qipan; چىپان يېزىسى / 棋盘乡), Saybagh Township (Sayibage; سايباغ يېزىسى / 萨依巴格乡)

Others (其他)

- 兵团叶城牧场 | 阿克塔什农场 | 普萨牧场 | 叶城县公安农场 | 叶城县良种场 | 叶城县园艺场 | 叶城县林场 | 叶城县种畜场

=== Makit County ===
Towns (بازىرى / 镇)

- Makit Town (Maigaiti; مەكىت بازىرى / 麦盖提镇), Bazarjemi (Bazajiemi; بازارجەمى بازىرى / 巴扎结米镇, formerly a township بازارجەمى يېزىسى / 巴扎结米乡)

Townships (يېزىسى / 乡)

- Shehitdong Township (Xiyitidun; شېھىتدۆڭ يېزىسى / 希依提墩乡), Yantaq Township (Yangtake; يانتاق يېزىسى / 央塔克乡), Tumental Township (Tumantale; تۈمەنتال يېزىسى / 吐曼塔勒乡), Ghazkol Township (Gazikule; غازكۆل يېزىسى / 尕孜库勒乡), Qizilawat Township (Kezileawati; قىزىلئاۋات يېزىسى / 克孜勒阿瓦提乡), Qumqisar Township (Kumukusa'er; قۇمقىسار يېزىسى / 库木库萨尔乡), Hangghitliq Township (Anggeteleke; ھاڭغىتلىق يېزىسى / 昂格特勒克乡), Qurma Township (Ku'erma; قۇرما يېزىسى / 库尔玛乡)

Others

- 五一林场, 胡杨林场, 良种场, 园艺场, 兵团43团, 兵团45团, 兵团46团, 农三师前进水库管理处

=== Yopurga County ===
Town (镇)

- Yopurga Town (岳普湖镇) | Aiximai (艾西买镇)

Township (乡)

- Yopurga Township (岳普湖乡) | Yekexianbaibaza Township (也克先拜巴扎乡) | Aqike Township (阿其克乡) | Seyeke Township (色也克乡) | Tieremu Township (铁热木乡) | Bayiawati Township (巴依阿瓦提乡) | Agonglukumu Township (阿洪鲁库木乡)

Others

- 兵团42团

=== Peyziwat / Payziwat / Jiashi County ===
Towns (بازىرى / 镇)

- Barin (Baren; بارىن بازىرى / 巴仁镇), Shekerkol (Xike'erkule; شېكەركۆل بازىرى / 西克尔库勒镇), Gholtoghraq (Wolituogelake; غولتوغراق بازىرى / 卧里托格拉克镇, formerly 卧里托格拉克乡), Shaptul (Xiaputule; شاپتۇل بازىرى / 夏普吐勒镇, formerly 夏普吐勒乡), Qizilboyi (Kezileboyi; 克孜勒博依镇, formerly قىزىلبويى يېزىسى / 克孜勒博依乡), Qoshawat (Hexia'awati; 和夏阿瓦提镇, formerly قوشئاۋات يېزىسى / 和夏阿瓦提乡)

Townships (يېزىسى / 乡)

- Terim Township (Tierimu; تېرىم يېزىسى / 铁日木乡), Yengimehelle Township (Yingmaili; يېڭىمەھەللە يېزىسى / 英买里乡), Janbaz Township (Jiangbazi; جانباز يېزىسى / 江巴孜乡), Misha Township (Mixia; مىشا يېزىسى / 米夏乡), Qizilsu Township (Kezilesu; قىزىلسۇ يېزىسى / 克孜勒苏乡), Gulluk Township (Guleluke; گۈللۈك يېزىسى / 古勒鲁克乡), Ordeklik Township (Yudaikelike; ئۆردەكلىك يېزىسى / 玉代克力克乡)

Others

- Nongsanshijiashizong Farm (农三师伽师总场)

=== Maralbexi County/Bachu County ===
Town (镇)

- Maralbeshi (Bachu Town; مارالبېشى بازىرى / 巴楚镇), Seriqbuya (Selibuya; سېرىقبۇيا بازىرى / 色力布亚镇), Awat (Awati; ئاۋات بازىرى / 阿瓦提镇), Achal (Sanchakou; ئاچال بازىرى / 三岔口镇)

Township (乡)

- Charbagh Township (Qiaerbage; چارباغ يېزىسى / 恰尔巴格乡), Doletbagh Township (Duolaitibage; دۆلەتباغ يېزىسى / 多来提巴格乡), Anakule Township (阿纳库勒乡), Shamal Township (Xiamale; شامال يېزىسى / 夏玛勒乡), Aqsaqmaral Township (Akesakemarele; ئاقساقمارال يېزىسى / 阿克萨克马热勒乡), Alaghir Township (Alage'er; ئالاغىر يېزىسى / 阿拉格尔乡), Chongqurchaq (Qiongkuerqiake; چوڭقۇرچاق يېزىسى / 琼库尔恰克乡), Yengiosteng Township (Yingwusitang; يېڭىئۆستەڭ يېزىسى / 英吾斯塘乡)

Others

- Xiahe Forest Plantation (下河林场), 兵团48团, 兵团52团

=== Taxkorgan Tajik Autonomous County ===
Town (镇)

- Taxkorgan Town (塔什库尔干镇) | Tajikeabati (塔吉克阿巴提镇)

Townships (乡)

- Tashikuergan Township (塔什库尔干乡) | Taheman Township (塔合曼乡) | Tizinafu Township (提孜那甫乡) | Dabudaer Township (达布达尔乡) | Maeryang (马尔洋乡) | Waqia Township (瓦恰乡) | Bandier Township (班迪尔乡) | Kukexiluge Township (库科西鲁格乡) | Bulunmusha Township (布伦木沙乡) | Datong Township (大同乡)

Ethnic Townships (民族乡)

- Kekeyaerkeerkezi Ethnic Township (科克亚尔柯尔克孜族乡)

Others

- Mazaer Sheep Farm (麻扎尔种羊场) | Bazadashi Forest Station (巴扎达什牧林场) | Dairy Farm (牛奶场) | Buhouyijilafu Farm (布候依吉拉甫农场)

== Kizilsu Kirghiz Autonomous Prefecture ==
=== Artux ===
Subdistricts (يولى كوچا باشقارمىسى / 街道):

- Bext Avenue Subdistrict (Xingfu Lu; بەخت يولى كوچا باشقارمىسى / 幸福路街道), Nurluq Avenue Subdistrict (Guangming Lu; نۇرلۇق يولى كوچا باشقارمىسى / 光明路街道), Xincheng Subdistrict (新城街道)

Town (بازىرى / 镇):

- Ustun Atush (Shang'atushi; ئۈستۈن ئاتۇش بازىرى / 上阿图什镇)

Townships (يېزىسى / 乡):

- Süntag (Songtake, Suntagh; سۇنتاغ يېزىسى / 松他克乡), Azak (Azhake, Azaq; ئازاق يېزىسى / 阿扎克乡), Agu (Ahu, Aghu; ئاغۇ يېزىسى / 阿湖乡), Katyaylak (Gedaliang, Kattaylaq; كاتتايلاق يېزىسى / 格达良乡), Karajül (Halajun, Karajol, Qarajol; قاراجول يېزىسى / 哈拉峻乡), Tugurmiti (Tugumaiti; تۈگۈرمىتى يېزىسى / 吐古买提乡)

Other areas:

- Bingtuan Nongsanshi Hongqi Farm (兵团农三师红旗农场)

=== Akto County ===
Town (镇)

- Akto Town (阿克陶镇) | Oytak (奥依塔克镇)

Townships (乡)

- Ujme Township (玉麦乡) | Pilal Township (皮拉力乡) | Barin Township (巴仁乡) | Karakeqik Township (喀热克其克乡) | Jamaterek Township (加马铁力克乡) | Muji Township (木吉乡) | Bulungkol (布伦口乡) | Kizilto Township (克孜勒陶乡) | Qarlung Township (恰尔隆乡) | Kosrap Township (库斯拉甫乡)

Ethnic Townships (民族乡)

- Tar Tajik Township (塔尔塔吉克族乡)

Others

- Tortayi Farm (托尔塔依农场) | Akdala Ranch (阿克达拉牧场) | Akto Signature Animal Nursery (阿克陶县原种场) | Duolaitibulake Pedigree Sheep Farm (多来提布拉克种羊场) | Kizilsu Forest Farm (克(孜勒苏柯尔克孜自治州林场) | Akto Plant Nursery (克孜勒苏柯尔克孜自治州苗甫)

=== Akqi County ===
Town (镇)

- Akqi Town (阿合奇镇)

Townships (乡)

- Kulansarak (库兰萨日克乡) | Saparbay (色帕巴依乡) | Somtax (苏木塔什乡) | Karaqi (哈拉奇乡) | Karabulak (哈拉布拉克乡)

Others

- 阿合奇县国营马场 | 阿合奇县食品牧场 | 阿合奇县良种场

=== Ulugqat County ===
Towns (镇)

- Wuqia (乌恰镇) | Kangsu (康苏镇)

Townships (乡)

- Baykurut (巴音库鲁提乡)|Boritokay (膘尔托阔依乡)|Bostanterak 波斯坦铁列克乡)|Jigin (吉根乡)|Kiziloy (黑孜苇乡)|Oksalur (吾合沙鲁乡)|Terak (铁列克乡)|Toyun (托云乡)|Ulugqat (乌鲁克恰提乡)

others

- Toyun Ranch (托云牧场)|乌恰县国营羊场

== Tacheng Prefecture ==
=== Tacheng City ===
Subdistrict (街道)

- Heping Subdistrict (和平街道) | Dubieke Subdistrict (杜别克街道) | Xincheng Subdistrict (新城街道)

Town (镇)

- Ergong (二工镇)

Townships (乡)

- 喀拉哈巴克乡 | Qiaxia Township (恰夏乡) | 阿不都拉乡 | Yemenle Township (也门勒乡)

Ethnic Townships (民族乡)

- Axier Dawoer Township (阿西尔达斡尔族乡)

Other (其他单位)

- 恰合吉牧场 | 博孜达克农场 | 窝依加依劳牧场 | 塔城地区种牛场 | 叶尔盖提兵团162团 | 阿克乔克兵团163团 | 乌拉斯台兵团164团

=== Wusu City ===
Subdistrict (街道)

- Xinshiqu Subdistrict (新市区街道), Nanyuan Subdistrict (南苑街道), Xichengqu Subdistrict 西城区街道, Hongqiao Subdistrict (虹桥街道), Kuihe Subdistrict (奎河街道)

Town (镇)

- Baiyanggou (白杨沟镇), Hatubuhu (哈图布呼镇), Huanggong (皇宫镇), Chepaizi (车排子镇), Ganhezi (甘河子镇), Baiquan (Baychuan) (百泉镇, بەيچۇەن), Sikeshu (Chigshor) (四棵树镇, چىگشور), Guertu (Gürt) (古尔图镇, گۈرت), Xihu (西湖镇), Xidagou (Shidagu) (西大沟镇, شىداگۇ)

Townships 乡

- Bashisihu Township (八十四户乡), Jiahezi Township (夹河子乡), Jiujianlou Township (九间楼乡), Shiqiao Township (石桥乡), Toutai Township (头台乡)

Ethnic townships (民族乡)

- Jiergeleteguole Mongol Township (吉尔格勒特郭愣蒙古族乡), Tabulehete Mongol Township (塔布勒合特蒙古族乡)

Others

- Ganjia Lake Ranch (甘家湖牧场), Bayingou Ranch (巴音沟牧场), Saileketi Ranch (赛力克提牧场), Wusu Prison (乌苏监狱), Ganjia Lake Forest Area 甘家湖林场, 兵团123团, 兵团124团, 兵团125团, 兵团126团, 兵团127团, 兵团128团, 兵团130团

=== Emin County ===
Town (镇)

- Emin Town (额敏镇)

Townships (乡)

- Jiaoqu Township (郊区乡) | Shanghu Township (上户乡) | Yushikalasu Township (玉什喀拉苏乡) | Jieleagashi Township (杰勒阿尕什乡) | Marelesu Township (玛热勒苏乡) | Kagalayemule Township (喀拉也木勒乡) | Lamazhao Township (喇嘛昭乡) | Erdaoqiao Township (二道桥乡)

Ethnic Townships (民族乡)

- Emaleguoleng Mongol Township (额玛勒郭楞蒙古族乡) | Huojierte Mongol Township (霍吉尔特蒙古族乡)

Others

- Erzhihe Ranch (二支河牧场) | Jiaerbulake Farm (加尔布拉克农场) | Kuoshibike Pedigree Ranch (阔什比克良种场) | Saeryemule Ranch (萨尔也木勒牧场) | Yemule Ranch (也木勒牧场) | Tachengyequ Pedigree Sheep Farm (塔城地区种羊场) | Wuzongbulake Ranch (吾宗布拉克牧场) | Shuifeng army regiment farm (水丰兵团团结农场) | Nongjiushi 农九师（红星岗兵团169团 | 锡伯提兵团166团 | 麦海因兵团167团 | 乌什水兵团168团 | 达因苏兵团165团）

=== Shawan County ===
Town (镇)

- Sadohezi (三道河子镇) | Sidaohezi (四道河子镇) | Laoshawan (老沙湾镇) | Wulanwusu (Ulan'us) (乌兰乌苏镇, ئۇلانئۇس) | Anjihai (Yansikhay) (安集海镇, يەنسىخەي) | Dongwan (东湾镇) | Sigebi (西戈壁镇)| Liumaowan (柳毛湾镇) | Jingouhe 金沟河镇

Township (乡)

- Shanghudi Township (商户地乡) | Daquan Township (大泉乡) | Boertonggu Township (博尔通古乡)

Others

- Cattle Circle Ranch (牛圈子牧场) | Boertonggu Ranch (博尔通古牧场) | Shawanxian Pedigree Ranch (沙湾县良种场)| 兵团121团 | 兵团122团 | 兵团123团 | 兵团133团 | 兵团134团 | 兵团135团 | 兵团141团 | 兵团142团 | 兵团143团 | 兵团144团 | 兵团151团

=== Toli County ===
Town (镇)

- Toli Town (托里镇) | Tieguanggou (铁厂沟镇) | Miaoergou (庙尔沟镇)

Township (乡) Duolate Township (多拉特乡) | Wuxuete Township (乌雪特乡)| Kupu Township (库普乡)| Ahkebielidou Township (阿克别里斗乡)

Others

- Baiyanghe Forest station (白杨河林场) | Laofengkou Forest station (老风口林场)| Baerlukeshantasi Special Forest station (巴尔鲁克山塔斯特林场)| 兵团170团 XPCC 170 unit

=== Yumin County ===
- Halabula (哈拉布拉镇)

Township (乡)

- Halabula Township ( 哈拉布拉乡) | Xindi Township (新地乡) | Aletengyemule Township 阿勒腾也木勒乡 |Jiyeke Township (吉也克乡)| Jiangkesi Township (江克斯乡)

Others

- Chahantuohai Ranch (察汗托海牧场) | 兵团161团 XPCC 161 unit

=== Hoboksar Mongol Autonomous County ===
Town

- Hoboksar Town (和布克赛尔镇), Hebutuoluogai (和什托洛盖镇)

Township (乡)

- Xiazigai Township (夏孜盖乡), Tiebukenwusan Township (铁布肯乌散乡), Chagankule Township (查干库勒乡), Bayinaopao Township (巴音敖包乡), Motege Township (莫特格乡)

Others

- Yikewutubulage Ranch (伊克乌图布拉格牧场), Nareheuke Ranch (那仁和布克牧场), Bagawutubulage Ranch (巴嘎乌图布拉格牧场), Busitunge Ranch (布斯屯格牧场), 兵团184团, Shajihai Mine (砂吉海矿区)

== Turpan Prefecture ==
=== Turpan ===
Subdistrict (街道)

- Laocheng Road Subdistrict (老城路街道), Gaochang Road Subdistrict (高昌路街道)

Town (镇)

- Qiqunhu (七泉湖镇), Daheyan (Dakheyan) (大河沿镇, داخېيەن)

Township (乡)

- Yaer Township (亚尔乡), Aidinghu Township (艾丁湖乡), Putao Township, Xinjiang (葡萄乡), Qiatekale Township (恰特卡勒乡), Erbao Township (Qarghoja) (二堡乡, قارغوجا), Sanbao Township (Astana) (三堡乡, ئاستانە), Shengjin Township (Singgim) (胜金乡, سىڭگىم)

=== Piqan County ===
Town (镇)

- Piqan Town (鄯善镇), Qiketai (Chiqtim) (七克台镇), Piqan Train Station (鄯善火车站镇), Lianmuqin (Lamjin) (连木沁镇, لەمجىن), Lukeqin Township (鲁克沁镇)

Township (乡)

- Bizhan Township (辟展乡), Dongbaza Hui Township (东巴扎回族乡), Tuyugou Township (吐峪沟乡), Dalangkan Township (达朗坎乡), Dikan Township (迪坎乡)

=== Toksun County ===
镇 Towns:

- Toksun Town (Tuokexun; توقسۇن بازىرى / 托克逊镇), Kümüx (Kumishi; كۈمۈش بازىرى / 库米什镇), Ke'erjian (克尔碱镇), Alehui (阿乐惠镇), Yilahu (伊拉湖镇), Xia (夏镇), Bostan (Bositan; 博斯坦镇)

乡 Township:

- Guolebuyi Township (郭勒布依乡)
