= Yongning, Xinjiang =

Yongning 永宁镇
- Town
- Location in Xinjiang
- Coordinates: 42°2′31″N 86°33′30″E
- Country: People's Republic of China
- Autonomous region: Xinjiang
- Autonomous prefecture: Bayingolin Mongol Autonomous Prefecture
- Autonomous county: Yanqi Hui Autonomous County
- Time zone: UTC+8 (China Standard)

Yongning (simplified Chinese: 永宁; traditional Chinese: 永寧; pinyin: Yǒngníng) is a town under the administration of Yanqi Hui Autonomous County, Xinjiang, China. As of 2018, it has 2 residential communities and 8 villages under its administration.

== See also ==
- List of township-level divisions of Xinjiang
