= Qigxin =

Qigxin 七个星
- Town
- 七个星镇
- Location in Xinjiang
- Coordinates: 42°01′12″N 86°18′11″E
- Country: China
- Province-level division: Xinjiang
- Prefecture: Bayin'gholin Mongol Autonomous Prefecture
- County: Yanqi Hui Autonomous County

Area
  - Total: 755 km^{2} (292 sq mi)
- Elevation: 1,084 m (3,556 ft)

Population (2000)
  - Total: 12,629
  - Density: 16.7/km^{2} (43.3/sq mi)

Qigxin (simplified Chinese: 七个星; traditional Chinese: 七個星; pinyin: Qīgèxīng; lit. 'Seven Stars') is an oasis town in central Xinjiang Uyghur Autonomous Region of Northwest China. It is under the administration of Yanqi Hui Autonomous County in Bayin'gholin Mongol Autonomous Prefecture. According to the 2000 census, the town has a population of 12,629 people and covers an area of 755 square kilometres (292 sq mi). The town is 36 kilometres (22 mi) west of Bosten Lake (the largest in Xinjiang) and is largely agricultural, producing grains, oil, sugar beet, fennel, pepper, cotton, tomato and livestock, but just on its outskirts lie the Tarim Basin, a desert.

== See also ==
- List of township-level divisions of Xinjiang
