= Wuhaoqu Township =

Wuhaoqu
- Township
- Location in Xinjiang Wuhaoqu (China)
- Coordinates: 42°4′53″N 86°37′27″E
- Country: China
- Province: Xinjiang
- Prefecture: Bayin'gholin Mongol Autonomous Prefecture
- County: Yanqi Hui Autonomous County

Area
  - Total: 96 km^{2} (37 sq mi)

Population (2000)
  - Total: 14,791

Ethnic groups
  - Major ethnic groups: Hui, Uyghur

Wuhaoqu (Chinese: 五号渠乡; pinyin: Wǔhàoqú xiāng) is a township in Yanqi Hui Autonomous County in the Bayin'gholin Mongol Autonomous Prefecture of Xinjiang, in Northwestern China. According to the 2000 Chinese census, the township has a population of 14,791 people and covers 96 square kilometres.

== See also ==
- List of township-level divisions of Xinjiang
