= Beidaqu Township =

Beidaqu
- Township
- Location in Xinjiang
- Coordinates: 42°8′15″N 86°34′59″E
- Country: China
- Province: Xinjiang
- Prefecture: Bayin'gholin Mongol Autonomous Prefecture
- County: Yanqi Hui Autonomous County

Population (2000)
  - Total: 9,026

Beidaqu (Chinese: 北大渠乡; pinyin: Běidàqú Xiāng) is a township in Yanqi Hui Autonomous County in the Bayin'gholin Mongol Autonomous Prefecture of Xinjiang, China. According to the 2000 Chinese census, the township has a population of 9,026 people.

== See also ==
- List of township-level divisions of Xinjiang
