= Sishilichengzi =

- Town
- Location in Xinjiang Sishilichengzi (China)
- Coordinates: 41°57′43″N 86°28′36″E
- Country: China
- Province: Xinjiang
- Prefecture: Bayin'gholin Mongol Autonomous Prefecture
- County: Yanqi Hui Autonomous County

Population (2000)
  - Total: 8,722

Sishilichengzi (Chinese: 四十里城子镇; pinyin: Sìshílǐchéngzi Zhèn) is a town in Yanqi Hui Autonomous County in the Bayin'gholin Mongol Autonomous Prefecture of Xinjiang, in Northwestern China. According to the 2010 Chinese census, the town has a population of 8,908 people.

== See also ==
- List of township-level divisions of Xinjiang
