= Qagan Qehe Township =

Qagan Qehe Township چاغانچېكە يېزىسى · 查汗采开乡
- Township
- Location in Xinjiang
- Coordinates: 42°05′35″N 86°26′24″E
- Country: China
- Region: Xinjiang
- Prefecture: Bayin'gholin Mongol Autonomous Prefecture
- County: Yanqi
- Elevation: 1,063 m (3,488 ft)

Population (2006)
  - Total: 5,115
- Time zone: UTC+8 (China Standard Time)

Qagan Qehe (Uyghur script: چاغانچېكە يېزىسى, Чаган Чәхә; simplified Chinese: 查汗采开乡; traditional Chinese: 查汗采開鄉; pinyin: Cháhàn Cǎikāi Xiāng) is a mining township on the Kaidu River in Central Xinjiang Uyghur Autonomous Region of the People's Republic of China. It is under the administration of Yanqi Hui Autonomous County in Bayin'gholin Mongol Autonomous Prefecture. According to the 2006 census, the township has a population of 5115 people, with 3712 living in the rural part of the township. Main products include grains, oil, sugar beet, fennel and tomatoes.

== See also ==
- List of township-level divisions of Xinjiang
