= Borhoi Township =

Borhoi Township بورقاي يېزىسى · 包尔海乡
- Township
- Location in Xinjiang
- Coordinates: 42°00′38″N 86°28′14″E
- Country: China
- Province-level division: Xinjiang
- Prefecture: Bayin'gholin Mongol Autonomous Prefecture
- County: Yanqi Hui Autonomous County
- Elevation: 1,059 m (3,474 ft)

Population (2006)
  - Total: 5,964

Borhoi (Uyghur script: بورقاي يېزىسى, Борхои; simplified Chinese: 包尔海乡; traditional Chinese: 包爾海鄉; pinyin: Bāoěrhǎi Xiāng) is a township in Central Xinjiang Uyghur Autonomous Region of Northwest China, 26 kilometres (16 mi) west of Bosten Lake, the largest lake in Xinjiang. It is under the administration of Yanqi Hui Autonomous County in Bayin'gholin Mongol Autonomous Prefecture. According to the 2006 Chinese census, the township has a population of 5964 people, the majority being involved in agriculture.

== See also ==
- List of township-level divisions of Xinjiang
