= Xindi =

Xindi may refer to:

- Xindi (Star Trek), a group of fictional races in the Star Trek universe
  - "The Xindi", an episode of Star Trek: Enterprise
- Xindi (instrument), a Chinese flute
- Xindi Township (新地乡), Weichang Manchu and Mongol Autonomous County, Hebei, China
