= Küybag District =

Küybag
- County-controlled district
- Country: People's Republic of China
- Province: Xinjiang
- County: Poskam
- Time zone: UTC+8 (China Standard Time)

Küybag or Kuiyibage was a county-controlled district in Zepu County, Xinjiang Uyghur Autonomous Region, China. In 2014, Küybag District was abolished and split into Küybag Town and Küybag Township.

== See also ==
- List of township-level divisions of Xinjiang
