= Bayanbulak Grassland National Nature Reserve =

Grassland in China

- (also: Bayinbuluke)
- IUCN category V (protected landscape/seascape)
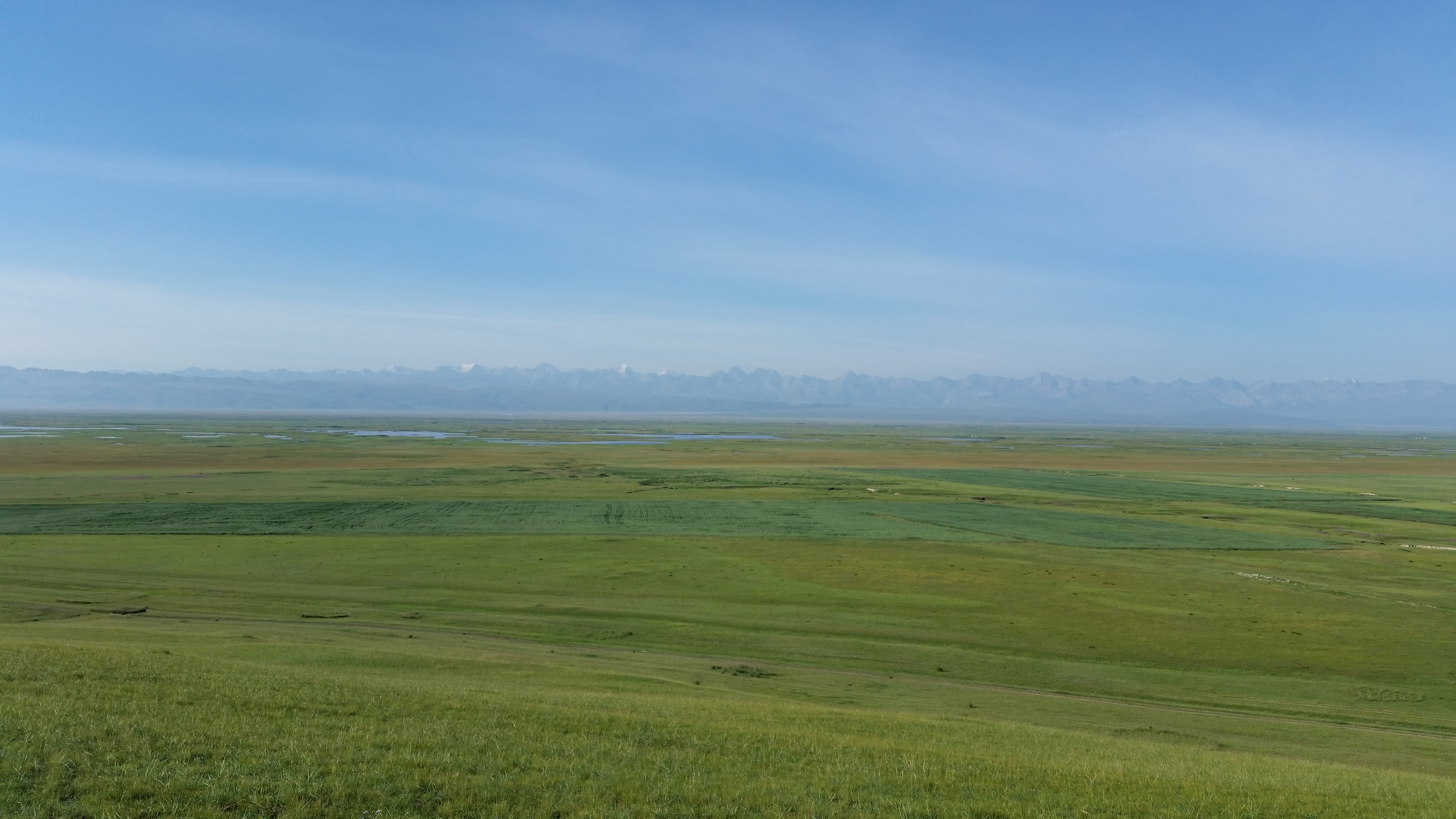
- Kaidu River, on the Bayan Baluk Reserve

- Location within China
- Location: Hejing County, Xinjiang, China
- Nearest city: Korla
- Coordinates: 42.75°N 84.33°E
- Area: 148,689 ha (1,486.89 km^{2}; 574.09 mi^{2})

Bayanbulak Grassland National Nature Reserve (Chinese: 巴音布鲁克; pinyin: Bāyīnbùlǔkè) (from Mongolian "abundant spring") is the second largest grassland in China, located in the Bayanbulak Basin of the Tian Shan mountains in northwest China. The terrain is mostly flat, and encompasses a middle section of the Kaidu River ("Peacock River"). The reserve is 200 km northwest of Korla in Bayingolin Mongol Autonomous Prefecture of Xinjiang Uyghur Autonomous Region.

As a high-altitude marshland (at 2,000 - 2,500 meters), the reserve is an important breeding and staging ground for birds and waterfowl, and is the highest-altitude breeding ground for swans in the world. The area has been designated an Important Bird and Biodiversity Area (IBA #CN-114) by Birdlife International.

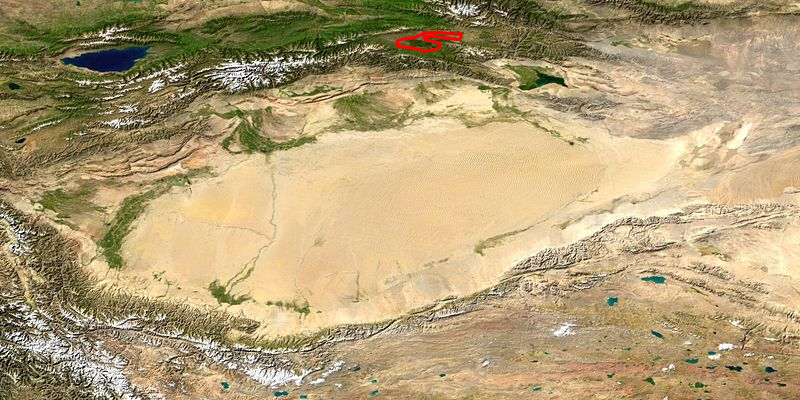
Borders of Bayan Bulak Reserve (in red outline)

At the center of the reserve is "Swan Lake", a connected series of wetlands, which was designated in 1980 as the "Bayanbulak Swan Nature Reserve" by the Xinjiang government, and upgraded in 1986 to a "National Swan Reserve" by the government of China.

== Topography ==
The Bayanbulak Basin is an intermontane valley of the basin-and-range of the Tian Shan mountains, to the north of the Tarim Basin. The total area of grassland is 23,835 km^{2} (9,203 mi^{2}), of which the reserve itself covers 1,486 km^{2} (574 mi^{2}). The Kaidu River runs from west to east through the area, at times meandering and leaving cutoff lakes, and is fed from streams from the high ranges of the Tian Shan to the north and south. The rivers are meandering and braided over gravel beds. In 1982, the Du-Ku highway was built across the Tian Shan, greatly opening access to the area.

== Climate ==
The area has a subarctic climate (Köppen climate classification Dwc). There are extreme seasonal variation in temperature, and nights are cold, even in the summer. The Tian Shan are high enough to collect precipitation from the moist arctic air coming from the northwest. The middle elevations, such as at Bayanbulak, receive an average of 270 mm of precipitation per year, enough to support steppe floral communities. Average annual temperature on the grassland is −4.8 °C (23.4 °F).

Climate data for Bayanbulak, elevation 2,458 m (8,064 ft), (1991–2020 normals, extremes 1981–present)
Month	Jan	Feb	Mar	Apr	May	Jun	Jul	Aug	Sep	Oct	Nov	Dec	Year
Record high °C (°F)	−1.0 (30.2)	1.1 (34.0)	14.2 (57.6)	22.2 (72.0)	24.7 (76.5)	24.8 (76.6)	27.7 (81.9)	28.3 (82.9)	24.2 (75.6)	19.2 (66.6)	11.7 (53.1)	0.6 (33.1)	28.3 (82.9)
Mean daily maximum °C (°F)	−19.5 (−3.1)	−14.2 (6.4)	−2.8 (27.0)	9.0 (48.2)	13.6 (56.5)	16.7 (62.1)	18.6 (65.5)	18.3 (64.9)	14.6 (58.3)	7.7 (45.9)	−3.4 (25.9)	−15.1 (4.8)	3.6 (38.5)
Daily mean °C (°F)	−26.4 (−15.5)	−21.7 (−7.1)	−10.2 (13.6)	1.3 (34.3)	5.9 (42.6)	9.6 (49.3)	11.3 (52.3)	10.4 (50.7)	6.2 (43.2)	−1.1 (30.0)	−11.0 (12.2)	−21.7 (−7.1)	−3.9 (24.9)
Mean daily minimum °C (°F)	−31.9 (−25.4)	−27.9 (−18.2)	−16.9 (1.6)	−5.1 (22.8)	−0.9 (30.4)	3.2 (37.8)	4.9 (40.8)	3.7 (38.7)	−1.0 (30.2)	−8.0 (17.6)	−16.7 (1.9)	−26.8 (−16.2)	−10.3 (13.5)
Record low °C (°F)	−49.6 (−57.3)	−43.0 (−45.4)	−37.4 (−35.3)	−24.0 (−11.2)	−14.6 (5.7)	−8.8 (16.2)	−6.7 (19.9)	−11.5 (11.3)	−13.1 (8.4)	−25.5 (−13.9)	−39.1 (−38.4)	−42.7 (−44.9)	−49.6 (−57.3)
Average precipitation mm (inches)	3.6 (0.14)	3.5 (0.14)	5.0 (0.20)	11.5 (0.45)	25.0 (0.98)	69.5 (2.74)	79.9 (3.15)	61.4 (2.42)	24.8 (0.98)	5.8 (0.23)	6.5 (0.26)	4.8 (0.19)	301.3 (11.88)
Average precipitation days (≥ 0.1 mm)	6.4	6.0	5.8	7.7	12.3	17.9	19.0	14.7	9.3	4.6	5.1	6.8	115.6
Average snowy days	11.1	11.7	12.0	10.2	6.2	1.2	0.2	0.5	3.3	6.6	10.8	12.5	86.3
Average relative humidity (%)	76	77	74	62	61	67	69	68	65	65	74	77	70
Mean monthly sunshine hours	186.5	195.2	239.1	243.9	254.5	229.7	244.1	255.0	246.3	241.5	180.5	165.6	2,681.9
Percentage possible sunshine	63	65	64	60	56	50	53	60	67	72	63	59	61
Source: China Meteorological Administration all-time extreme temperature

== Ecoregion ==
The Bayan Bulak Reserve is in the Tian Shan montane steppe and meadows ecoregion (WWF #1019). This region centers on the isolated Tian Sham mountains of Central Asia, and is characterized by extreme altitude differences - from glaciers at the 7,400 meter levels of the peaks to the flat deserts and steppes at 2,000 meters.

== Flora and Fauna ==
The vegetation is sub-alpine and alpine meadow and steppe for the most part. The lowest sections of the basin are swamp and swamp-meadow. The greater grasslands of the Bayanbulak are one of the most productive pasturelands in China, with an estimated 1.5 million sheep causing over-grazing in areas around the reserve.

In recent years, there has been aggressive growth of Pedicularis kansuensis, a type of Lousewort, that has damaged the local vegetation.

The area is best known for its breeding swans. The swan population was estimated at over 20,000 in the 1980s, but by 2001 this had declined to 2,000. Over 120 species of birds have been recorded at the site. The swamp areas, most valuable to the waterfowl, have characteristic vegetation of Carex (sedges), Triglochin palustris (marsh arrowgrass), Batrachium, and Utricularia (bladderwort).

== Access and Tourism ==
An admission fee is charged for tourists. Hotels and guest houses are available in Bayanbulak, and tents may be rented on the grassland. There is a cultural event for locals and tourists each year, the Nadam Fair, featuring horse racing, wrestling, and other local customs.

== See also ==
- List of protected areas of China

=== Mongolia ===
- Bayanbulag, a sum (district) in Bayankhongor Aimags (province)

=== Russia ===
- Bayan-Bulak, a ulus in Aginsky District, Agin-Buryat Okrug, Zabaykalsky Krai
