= Anningqu =

Anningqu 安宁渠
- Town
- 安宁渠镇
- Location in Xinjiang
- Coordinates: 43°58′46″N 87°30′17″E
- Country: People's Republic of China
- Province: Xinjiang
- Prefecture: Ürümqi
- County: Ürümqi County

Area
  - Total: 28 km^{2} (11 sq mi)

Population (2006)
  - Total: 10,554
- Time zone: UTC+8 (China Standard Time)

Anningqu Town (simplified Chinese: 安宁渠; traditional Chinese: 安寧渠; pinyin: Ānníngqú) is a town and suburb of Ürümqi in Xinjiang, in northwestern China. The town, which covers 28 square kilometres, has 5 administrative villages, 21 village groups, and has a total population of 10,554 people.

Anningqu as a town began more than a hundred years ago, and during the Qing dynasty it was a market place for merchants along the Tianshan Road. In 1965 it became the Anningqu Township, one of the official divisions of the prefecture-level city of Ürümqi.

Anningqu Town is located in the northern suburbs of Ürümqi on an alluvial plain and in a temperate arid climate zone. The town has abundant water resources and suitable irrigation for agriculture and animal husbandry.

== See also ==
- List of township-level divisions of Xinjiang
