= Erbao Township =

Erbao Township 二堡乡 قارغوجا
- Township
- Location of Erbao Township in Xinjiang
- Coordinates (Turpan government): 42°52′30″N 89°32′30″E
- Country: People's Republic of China
- Region: Xinjiang
- Prefecture-level city: Turpan
- District: Gaochang District

Population (2010)
  - Total: 12,417
- Time zone: UTC+8 (China Standard)
- Postal code: 838000
- Area code: 0995

Erbao Township (Uyghur: قارغوجا, Chinese: 二堡乡), is a township-level division located in the oasis city of Turpan, in the Xinjiang Uyghur Autonomous Region of the China.

Erbao Township formerly held the highest recorded temperature in Mainland China, at 50.5 °C (122.9 °F) on 10 July 2017 until it was beaten by Sanbao Township, Xinjiang which recorded a temperature of 52.2 °C (126.0 °F), on 16 July 2023.

== See also ==
- List of township-level divisions of Xinjiang
