= Hoxud County =

Hoxud County 和硕县 (Chinese) خوشۇت ناھىيىسى (Uyghur) ᠬᠣᠱᠤᠳ ᠰᠢᠶᠠᠨ (Mongolian)
- County
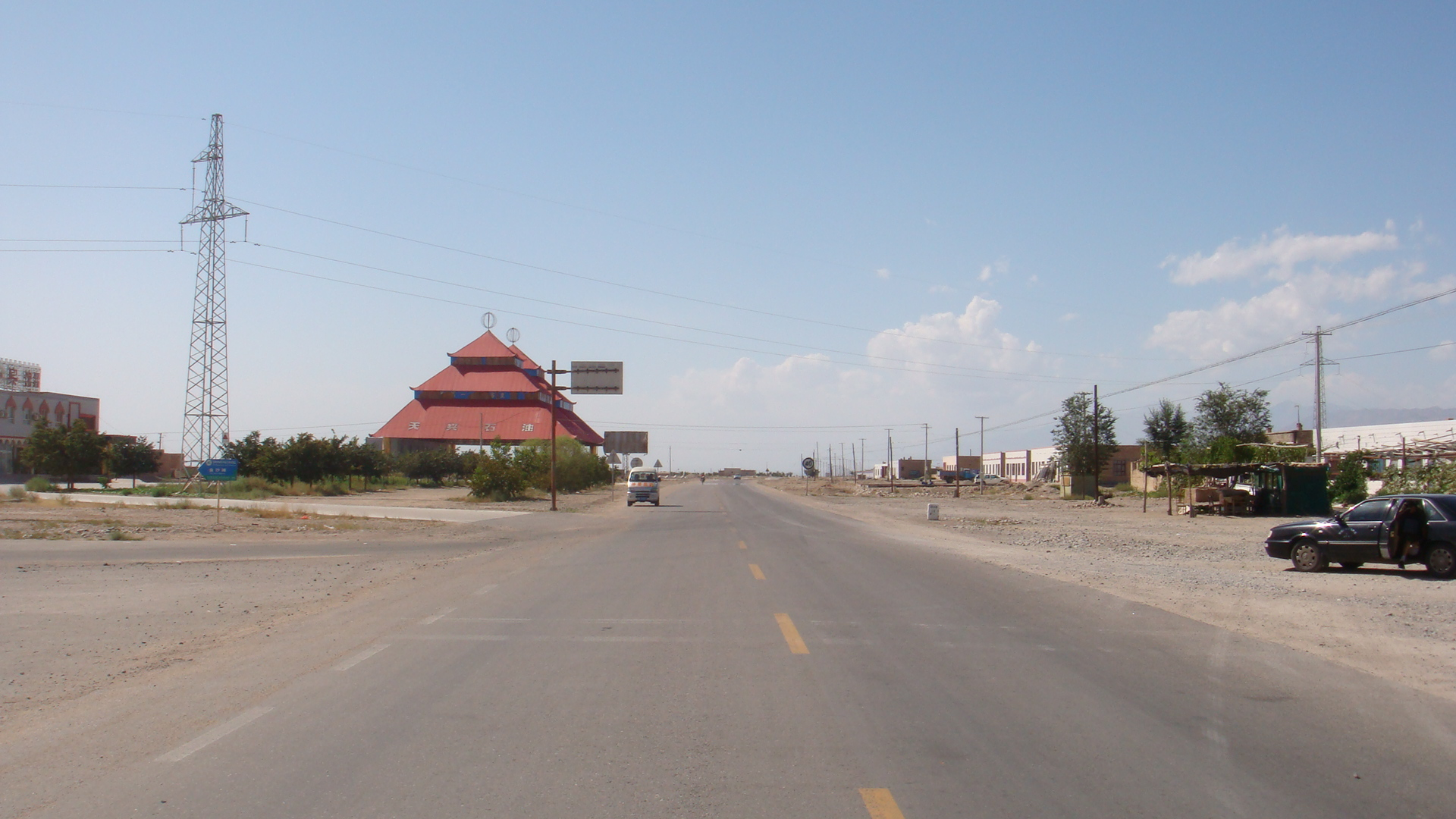

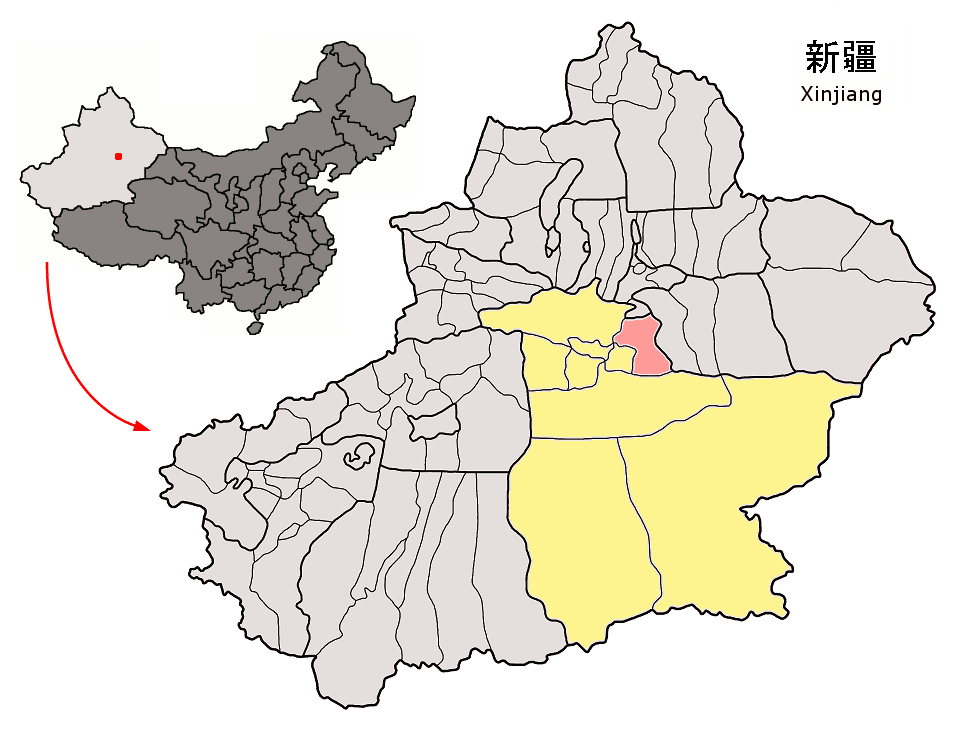
- Location of Hoxud County (red) within Bayingolin Prefecture (yellow) and Xinjiang

- Location of the seat in Xinjiang Hoxud (Xinjiang) Hoxud (China)
- Coordinates: 42°16′N 86°51′E
- Country: China
- Autonomous region: Xinjiang
- Autonomous prefecture: Bayingolin
- County seat: Tewilga

Area
  - Total: 12,739.86 km^{2} (4,918.89 sq mi)

Population (2020)
  - Total: 59,299
  - Density: 4.6546/km^{2} (12.055/sq mi)
- Time zone: UTC+8 (China Standard (Note: Locals in Xinjiang frequently observe UTC+6 (Xinjiang Time), 2 hours behind Beijing.))
- Website: www.hoxut.gov.cn

Hoxud County

Chinese name
- Simplified Chinese: 和硕县
- Traditional Chinese: 和碩縣
Transcriptions
Standard Mandarin
- Hanyu Pinyin: Héshuò Xiàn
Yue: Cantonese
- Jyutping: wo^{4}sek^{6} jyun^{2}

Mongolian name
- Mongolian Cyrillic: Хошууд сиан
- Mongolian script: ᠬᠣᠱᠤᠳ ᠰᠢᠨ
Transcriptions
- SASM/GNC: Qošud siyan

Uyghur name
- Uyghur: خوشۇت ناھىيىسى
Transcriptions
- Latin Yëziqi: Xoshut nahiyisi
- Yengi Yeziⱪ: Hoxut naⱨiyisi
- SASM/GNC: Hoxut Nahiyisi
- Siril Yëziqi: Хошут наһийиси

Hoxud County is a county in the Xinjiang Uyghur Autonomous Region and is under the administration of the Bayin'gholin Mongol Autonomous Prefecture. It contains an area of 12,753 km^{2} (4,924 sq mi). According to the 2002 census, it has a population of 60,000.

== Demographics ==
The proportion of nationalities in Hoxud County, 2018
Nationality	Percentage
Han People	63.5%
Uyghurs	16.4%
Hui People	10.1%
Mongols	8.6%
Others	1.4%
Source of the population statistics :

== Administrative divisions ==
Hoxud County is made up of 3 towns, 3 townships, and 1 ethnic township.

Name	Simplified Chinese	Hanyu Pinyin	Uyghur (UEY)	Uyghur Latin (ULY)	Mongolian (traditional)	Mongolian (Cyrillic)	Administrative division code
Towns
Tewilga Town	特吾里克镇	Tèwúlǐkè Zhèn	تېۋىلغا بازىرى	tëwilgha baziri	ᠲᠠᠪᠢᠯᠭ᠎ᠠ ᠪᠠᠯᠭᠠᠰᠤᠨ	Тавилга балгас	652828100
Tagarqi Town	塔哈其镇	Tǎhāqí Zhèn	تاغارچى بازىرى	tagharchi baziri	ᠲᠠᠭᠠᠷᠴᠢ ᠪᠠᠯᠭᠠᠰᠤᠨ	Таарч балгас	652828101
Qoh Town	曲惠镇	Qūhuì Zhèn	چۇقۇ بازىرى	chuqu baziri	ᠴᠣᠬᠣ ᠪᠠᠯᠭᠠᠰᠤᠨ	Цох балгас	652828102
Townships
Suhat Township	苏哈特乡	Sūhātè Xiāng	سوخاتۇ يېزىسى	soxatu yëzisi	ᠰᠤᠬᠠᠢᠲᠤ ᠰᠤᠮᠤᠨ	Сухайт суман	652828203
Narinker Township	乃仁克尔乡	Nǎirénkè'ěr Xiāng	نەرىنكىر يېزىسى	nerinkir yëzisi	ᠨᠠᠷᠢᠩᠭᠡᠷ ᠰᠤᠮᠤᠨ	Нэрэнгэр суман	652828204
Shintara Township	新塔热乡	Xīntǎrè Xiāng	شىنتارا يېزىسى	shintara yëzisi	ᠱᠢᠨᠡᠲ᠋ᠠᠷᠢᠶ᠎ᠠ ᠰᠤᠮᠤᠨ	Шнэтэрье суман	652828205
Ethnic Township
Uxxaktal Hui Ethnic Township	乌什塔拉回族民族乡	Wūshítǎlā Huízú Mínzúxiāng	ئۇششاقتال خۇيزۇ يېزىسى	Ushshaqtal xuyzu yëzisi	ᠤᠱᠢᠲᠠᠯ᠎ᠠ ᠬᠣᠲᠣᠩ ᠦᠨᠳᠦᠰᠦᠲᠡᠨ ᠦ ᠰᠤᠮᠤᠨ	Уштэл хотон үндэстэний суман	652828200

Others:

- Qingshuihe Farm (清水河农场, چىڭسىخوزا دېھقانچىلىق مەيدانى, ᠴᠢᠩ ᠱᠦᠢ ᠾᠧ
  ᠲᠠᠷᠢᠶᠠᠯᠠᠩ ᠤᠨ
  ᠲᠠᠯᠠᠪᠠᠢ)
- Malan Public Security Bureau Jurisdiction, Hoxud County (和硕县马兰公安管区)

== Climate ==
Climate data for Hoxud, elevation 1,085 m (3,560 ft), (1991–2020 normals, extremes 1991–present)
Month	Jan	Feb	Mar	Apr	May	Jun	Jul	Aug	Sep	Oct	Nov	Dec	Year
Record high °C (°F)	5.0 (41.0)	15.2 (59.4)	25.9 (78.6)	33.2 (91.8)	35.1 (95.2)	37.7 (99.9)	40.2 (104.4)	40.4 (104.7)	34.9 (94.8)	28.6 (83.5)	18.8 (65.8)	8.1 (46.6)	40.4 (104.7)
Mean daily maximum °C (°F)	−4.0 (24.8)	3.3 (37.9)	12.8 (55.0)	21.3 (70.3)	26.3 (79.3)	29.9 (85.8)	31.3 (88.3)	30.6 (87.1)	26.0 (78.8)	18.1 (64.6)	7.8 (46.0)	−1.9 (28.6)	16.8 (62.2)
Daily mean °C (°F)	−11.3 (11.7)	−4.2 (24.4)	5.2 (41.4)	13.5 (56.3)	18.5 (65.3)	22.5 (72.5)	23.6 (74.5)	22.1 (71.8)	16.5 (61.7)	8.0 (46.4)	−0.3 (31.5)	−8.1 (17.4)	8.8 (47.9)
Mean daily minimum °C (°F)	−17.0 (1.4)	−11.0 (12.2)	−2.4 (27.7)	5.3 (41.5)	9.8 (49.6)	14.3 (57.7)	15.8 (60.4)	14.0 (57.2)	8.2 (46.8)	0.5 (32.9)	−6.1 (21.0)	−12.9 (8.8)	1.5 (34.8)
Record low °C (°F)	−26.7 (−16.1)	−25.7 (−14.3)	−13.4 (7.9)	−5.6 (21.9)	−0.5 (31.1)	4.4 (39.9)	6.0 (42.8)	4.7 (40.5)	−2.7 (27.1)	−7.0 (19.4)	−17.7 (0.1)	−25.8 (−14.4)	−26.7 (−16.1)
Average precipitation mm (inches)	2.2 (0.09)	3.0 (0.12)	3.2 (0.13)	6.8 (0.27)	14.2 (0.56)	17.4 (0.69)	22.6 (0.89)	15.1 (0.59)	6.9 (0.27)	4.6 (0.18)	2.9 (0.11)	2.8 (0.11)	101.7 (4.01)
Average precipitation days (≥ 0.1 mm)	3.3	1.5	1.0	1.6	3.1	5.1	7.2	5.3	3.0	1.5	1.0	3.1	36.7
Average snowy days	8.8	2.9	0.7	0.5	0	0	0	0	0	0.1	1.5	8.4	22.9
Average relative humidity (%)	75	63	43	38	43	49	56	58	61	65	69	77	58
Mean monthly sunshine hours	173.2	200.2	253.3	267.3	299.6	289.0	290.5	287.7	281.0	259.9	202.6	140.8	2,945.1
Percentage possible sunshine	58	66	67	66	66	63	64	68	77	78	70	50	66
Source: China Meteorological Administrationall-time September high
