= Lunnan =

- Language: Norwegian

Origin
- Region of origin: Norway

Lunnan is a Norwegian surname. Notable people with the surname include:

- Randi Lunnan (born 1963), Norwegian organizational theorist
- Andreas Lunnan (1940–2012), Norwegian television presenter
