= Yanqi Hui Autonomous County =

Yanqi Hui Autonomous County 焉耆回族自治县 (Chinese) يەنجى خۇيزۇ ئاپتونوم ناھىيىسى (Uyghur) Kara Shahr, Yenki, Qarasheher, Karashahr
- Autonomous county
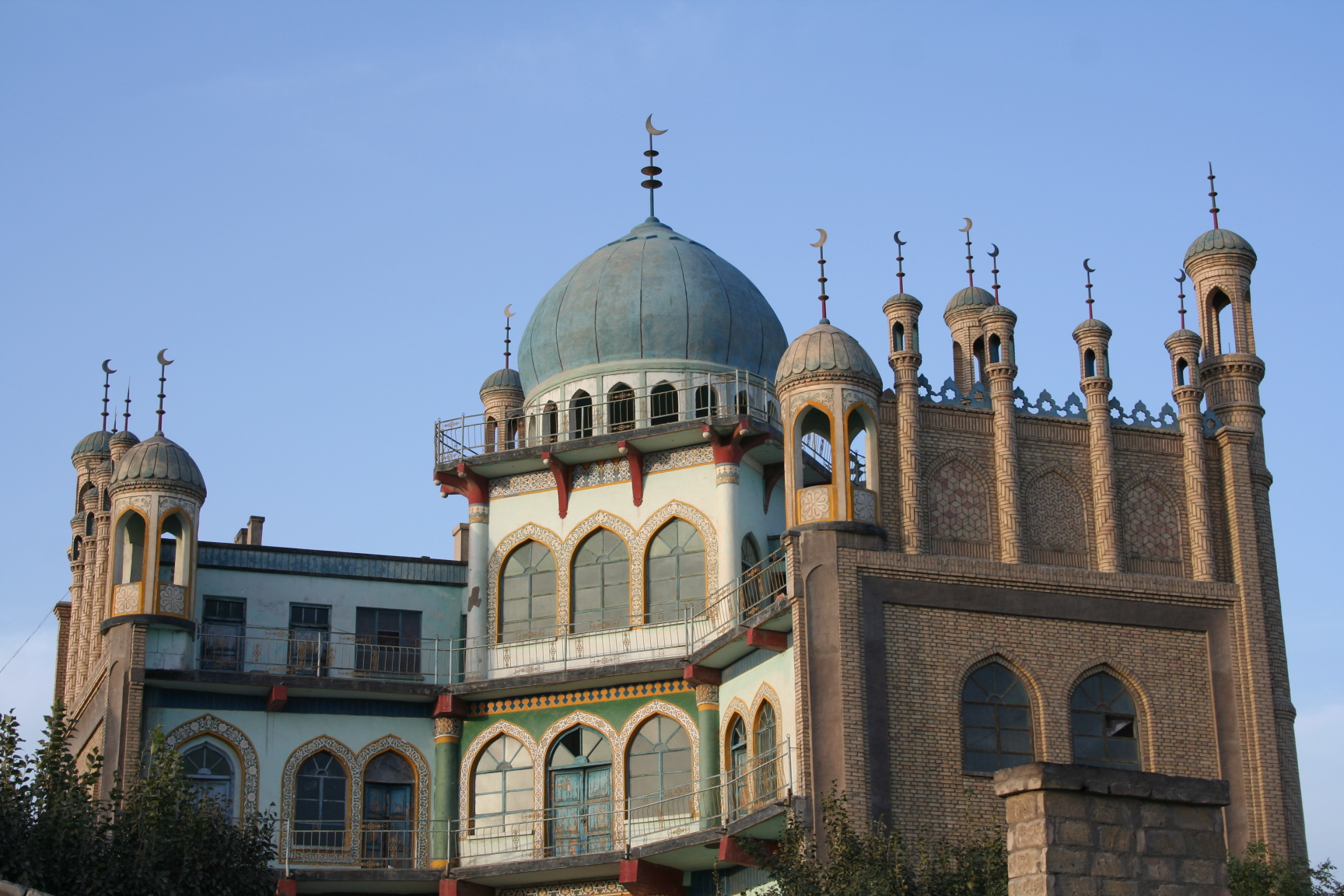
- Mosque in the city center of Yanqi

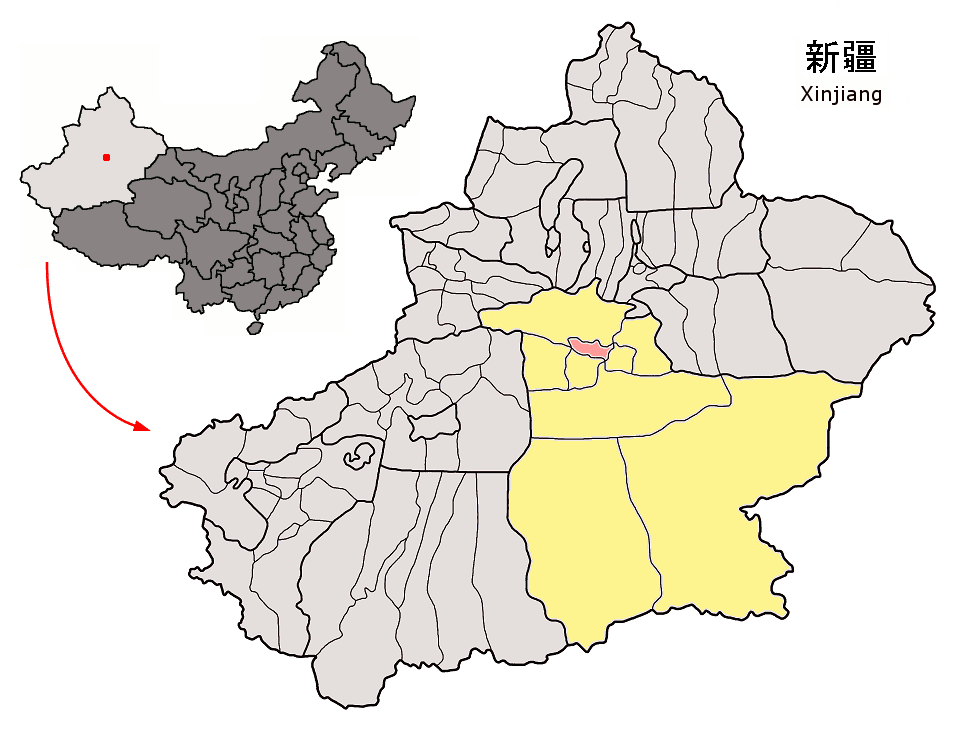
- Yanqi County (red) within Bayin'gholin Prefecture (yellow) and Xinjiang

- Location of the seat in Xinjiang Yanqi (Xinjiang) Yanqi (China)
- Coordinates: 42°03′35″N 86°34′27″E
- Country: China
- Autonomous region: Xinjiang
- Autonomous prefecture: Bayin'gholin
- County seat: Karasahr (Yanqi)

Area
  - Total: 2,429.2 km^{2} (937.9 sq mi)

Population (2020)
  - Total: 122,961
  - Density: 50.618/km^{2} (131.10/sq mi)
- Time zone: UTC+8 (China Standard (Note: Locals in Xinjiang frequently observe UTC+6 (Xinjiang Time), 2 hours behind Beijing.))
- Website: www.xjyq.gov.cn

Yanqi Hui Autonomous County
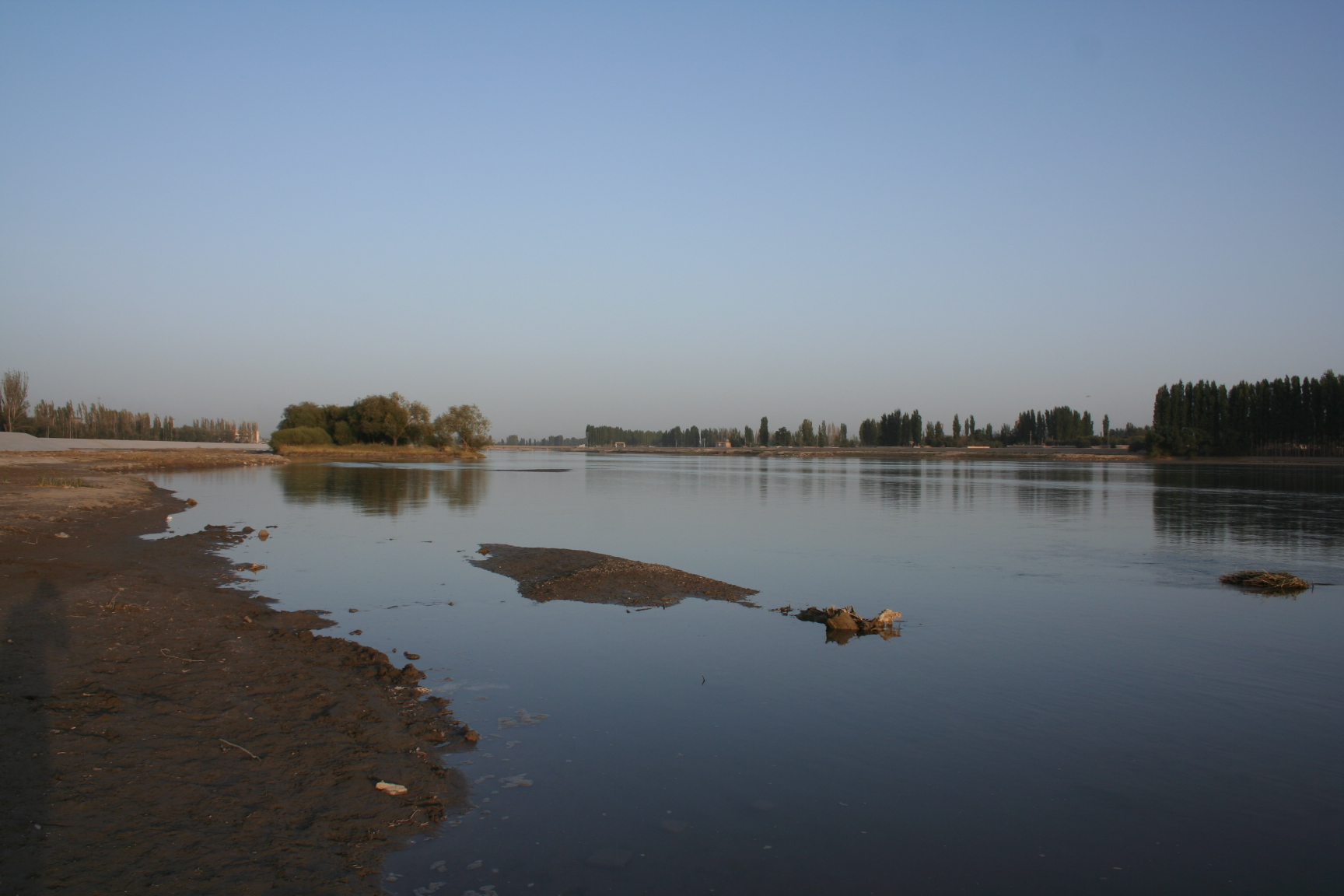
- Kaidu River (开都河), ancient name Liusha River (流沙河), in the seat of Yanqi

Chinese name
- Simplified Chinese: 焉耆回族自治县
- Traditional Chinese: 焉耆回族自治縣
Transcriptions
Standard Mandarin
- Hanyu Pinyin: Yānqí Huízú Zìzhìxiàn
other Mandarin
- Xiao'erjing: یًاکِ خُوِزُو زِجِ‌ثِیًا

Uyghur name
- Uyghur: يەنجى خۇيزۇ ئاپتونوم ناھىيىسى
Transcriptions
- Latin Yëziqi: Yenji Xuyzu Aptonom Nahiyisi
- Yengi Yeziⱪ: Yenji Xuyzu Aptonom Nahiyisi
- SASM/GNC: Yanji Huyzu Aptonom Nahiyisi
- Siril Yëziqi: Үәнҗи Хуизу Аптоном Наһийиси

Yanqi Hui Autonomous County (Uyghur: Qarasheher, Karashahr) is an autonomous county in the Xinjiang Uyghur Autonomous Region and is under the administration of the Bayin'gholin Mongol Autonomous Prefecture. It has an area of 2,429 km^{2} (938 sq mi). According to the 2002 census, it has a population of 120,000. The Shikshin Buddhist Temple Ruins are located in Yanqi County, about 25–30 km (16–19 mi) southwest of the town of Yanqi.

== Administrative division ==
The Yanqi Hui Autonomous County is made up of 4 towns and 4 townships:

Name	Simplified Chinese	Hanyu Pinyin	Uyghur (UEY)	Uyghur Latin (ULY)	Mongolian (traditional)	Mongolian (Cyrillic)	Administrative division code
Towns
Karasahr Town (Yanqi Town)	焉耆镇	Yānqí Zhèn	قاراشەھەر بازىرى	qarasheher baziri	ᠶᠠᠨᠵᠢ ᠪᠠᠯᠭᠠᠰᠤ	Яанж балгас	652826100
Xigxin Town (Shikshin Town, Qigxin Town)	七个星镇	Qīgèxīng Zhèn	شىگشىن بازىرى	shigshin baziri			652826101
Yongning Town	永宁镇	Yǒngníng Zhèn	يۇڭنىڭ بازىرى	yungning baziri			652826102
Denzil Town (Sishilichengzi Town)	四十里城子镇	Sìshílǐchéngzǐ Zhèn	دەنزىل بازىرى	denzil baziri			652826103
Townships
Beidaqu Township	北大渠乡	Běidàqú Xiāng	بېيداچۈ يېزىسى	bëydachü yëzisi			652826200
Wuhaoqu Township	五号渠乡	Wǔhàoqú Xiāng	ۋۇخاۋچۈ يېزىسى	wuxawchü yëzisi			652826201
Qagan Qehe Township	查汗采开乡	Cháhàncǎikāi Xiāng	چاغانچېكە يېزىسى	chaghanchëke yëzisi			652826203
Borhoi Township	包尔海乡	Bāo'ěrhǎi Xiāng	بورقاي يېزىسى	borqay yëzisi			652826204

Others:

- Wangjiazhuang Pasture (王家庄牧场, ۋاڭجياجۇاڭ چارۋىچىلىق فېرمىسى)
- Suhai Seed Farm (苏海良种场)

== Demographics ==
The proportion of nationalities in Yanqi Hui Autonomous County, 2018
Nationality	Percentage
Han People	37.5%
Uyghurs	35.0%
Hui People	24.3%
Mongols	2.3%
Others	0.9%
Source of the population statistics :

== History ==
See Karasahr.

== Climate ==
Climate data for Yanqi, elevation 1,055 m (3,461 ft), (1991–2020 normals, extremes 1981–present)
Month	Jan	Feb	Mar	Apr	May	Jun	Jul	Aug	Sep	Oct	Nov	Dec	Year
Record high °C (°F)	6.8 (44.2)	16.0 (60.8)	24.1 (75.4)	33.6 (92.5)	34.9 (94.8)	36.1 (97.0)	39.3 (102.7)	38.8 (101.8)	34.9 (94.8)	28.3 (82.9)	18.5 (65.3)	7.4 (45.3)	39.3 (102.7)
Mean daily maximum °C (°F)	−4.3 (24.3)	3.4 (38.1)	12.9 (55.2)	21.4 (70.5)	26.3 (79.3)	29.6 (85.3)	31.1 (88.0)	30.3 (86.5)	25.8 (78.4)	18.1 (64.6)	7.8 (46.0)	−2.1 (28.2)	16.7 (62.0)
Daily mean °C (°F)	−11.1 (12.0)	−4.3 (24.3)	4.9 (40.8)	13.4 (56.1)	18.7 (65.7)	22.4 (72.3)	23.6 (74.5)	22.3 (72.1)	17.3 (63.1)	9.4 (48.9)	0.8 (33.4)	−7.4 (18.7)	9.2 (48.5)
Mean daily minimum °C (°F)	−16.4 (2.5)	−11.0 (12.2)	−2.5 (27.5)	5.5 (41.9)	11.1 (52.0)	15.2 (59.4)	16.6 (61.9)	15.2 (59.4)	9.7 (49.5)	2.4 (36.3)	−4.4 (24.1)	−11.7 (10.9)	2.5 (36.5)
Record low °C (°F)	−26.8 (−16.2)	−24.9 (−12.8)	−16.4 (2.5)	−4.4 (24.1)	−0.9 (30.4)	4.7 (40.5)	7.2 (45.0)	6.0 (42.8)	0.1 (32.2)	−6.4 (20.5)	−21.6 (−6.9)	−25.9 (−14.6)	−26.8 (−16.2)
Average precipitation mm (inches)	1.6 (0.06)	2.3 (0.09)	1.9 (0.07)	5.4 (0.21)	12.1 (0.48)	14.3 (0.56)	16.6 (0.65)	13.4 (0.53)	6.5 (0.26)	4.0 (0.16)	1.2 (0.05)	1.8 (0.07)	81.1 (3.19)
Average precipitation days (≥ 0.1 mm)	2.9	1.5	0.7	1.2	2.6	4.7	6.8	4.5	2.8	1.4	0.7	2.9	32.7
Average snowy days	8.9	2.6	0.4	0.5	0	0	0	0	0	0.2	0.9	8.5	22
Average relative humidity (%)	76	63	47	40	42	49	55	56	57	61	70	77	58
Mean monthly sunshine hours	161.7	194.8	250.9	270.7	307.4	293.8	299.3	295.5	286.2	264.3	202.4	130.4	2,957.4
Percentage possible sunshine	54	64	67	67	68	65	66	70	78	79	70	46	66
Source: China Meteorological Administrationall-time February highall-time September highall-time record high

== Economy ==
The county economy is predominantly agricultural with 13,000 hectares used to cultivate red pepper. The county is considered the most important area for red pepper production in China. During the red pepper harvest season beginning in September, the county is home to the remarkable sight of drying peppers sitting in the Gobi Desert "as far as the eye can see".

As of 1885, there was about 25,300 acres (167,805 mu) of cultivated land in Kara Shahr.
