= Bohu County =

Bohu County 博湖县 (Chinese) باغراش ناھىيىسى (Uyghur) ᠪᠣᠰᠲᠠ ᠨᠠᠭᠤᠷ ᠰᠢᠶᠠᠨ (Mongolian) Bostnur, Bagrax
- County
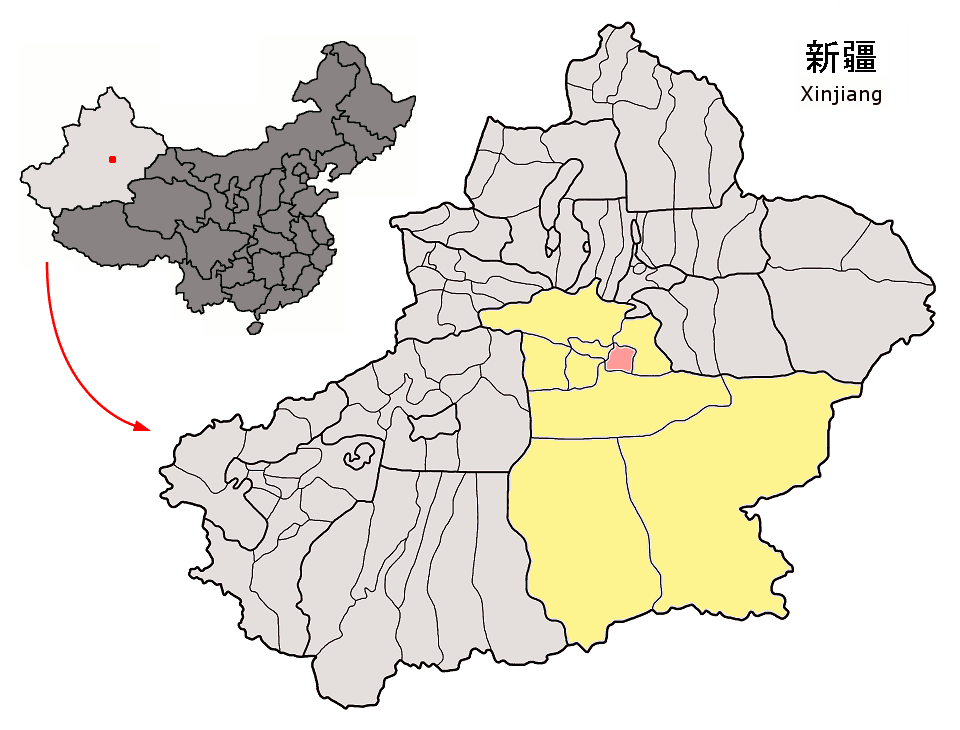
- Bohu County (red) within Bayingolin Prefecture (yellow) and Xinjiang

- Location of the seat in Xinjiang Bohu (Xinjiang) Bohu (China)
- Coordinates: 41°58′49″N 86°37′55″E
- Country: China
- Autonomous region: Xinjiang
- Autonomous prefecture: Bayingolin
- County seat: Bohu Town

Area
  - Total: 3,593.11 km^{2} (1,387.31 sq mi)

Population (2020)
  - Total: 48,288
  - Density: 13.439/km^{2} (34.807/sq mi)
- Time zone: UTC+8 (China Standard (Note: Locals in Xinjiang frequently observe UTC+6 (Xinjiang Time), 2 hours behind Beijing.))
- Website: www.xjbh.gov.cn

Bohu County

Chinese name
- Simplified Chinese: 博湖县
- Traditional Chinese: 博湖縣
Transcriptions
Standard Mandarin
- Hanyu Pinyin: Bóhú Xiàn
Yue: Cantonese
- Jyutping: bok^{3}wu^{4} jyun^{2}

Alternative Chinese name
- Simplified Chinese: 博斯腾县
- Traditional Chinese: 博斯騰縣
Transcriptions
Standard Mandarin
- Hanyu Pinyin: Bósīténg Xiàn

Mongolian name
- Mongolian Cyrillic: Бостнуур шянь
- Mongolian script: ᠪᠣᠰᠲᠠᠨᠠᠭᠤᠷ ᠰᠢᠶᠠᠨ

Uyghur name
- Uyghur: باغراش ناھىيىسى
Transcriptions
- Latin Yëziqi: Baghrash Nahiyisi
- Yengi Yeziⱪ: Baƣrax Naⱨiyisi
- SASM/GNC: Bagrax Nahiyisi
- Siril Yëziqi: Бағраш наһийиси

Bohu County (Chinese: 博湖县) as the official romanized name, also transliterated from Uyghur as Bagrax County (Uyghur: باغراش ناھىيىسى; Chinese: 博斯腾县), is a county in the central part of the Xinjiang Uyghur Autonomous Region and is under the administration of the Bayin'gholin Mongol Autonomous Prefecture. It contains an area of 3,603 km^{2} (1,391 sq mi). According to the 2002 census, it has a population of 60,000.

== Etymology ==
The area was first populated by Khoshut Mongolians who settled by Bosten Lake (Chinese: 博斯騰湖; pinyin: Bósīténg Hú). A county was not officially set up until 1971 and was named Bohu (博湖; Bóhú), an abbreviation of "Bosten Lake".

== Subdivisions ==
Bohu County is made up of 2 towns and 5 townships.

Name	Simplified Chinese	Hanyu Pinyin	Uyghur (UEY)	Uyghur Latin (ULY)	Mongolian (traditional)	Mongolian (Cyrillic)	Administrative division code
Towns
Bohu Town (Bostnur, Bagrax)	博湖镇	Bóhú Zhèn	باغراش بازىرى	baghrash baziri	ᠪᠣᠰᠲᠣᠨᠠᠭᠤᠷ ᠪᠠᠯᠭᠠᠰᠤᠨ	Бостнуур балгас	652829100
Bumbut Town	本布图镇	Běnbùtú Zhèn	بۈمبۈت بازىرى	bümbüt baziri	ᠪᠤᠮᠪᠠᠲᠤ ᠪᠠᠯᠭᠠᠰᠤᠨ	Бумбат балгас	652829101
Townships
Taban Johon Township (Tabanjökin)	塔温觉肯乡	Tǎwēnjuékěn Xiāng	تابانجۆكىن يېزىسى	tabanjökin yëzisi	ᠲᠠᠪᠤᠨᠵᠥ᠋ᠬᠥᠨ ᠰᠤᠮᠤᠨ	Тавнзүүн суман	652829200
Ulan Jegsen Township (Ulan Jekisin)	乌兰再格森乡	Wūlánzàigésēn Xiāng	ئۇلان جېكىسىن يېزىسى	Ulan jëkisin yëzisi	ᠤᠯᠠᠭᠠᠨᠵᠡᠭᠡᠰᠦᠨ ᠰᠤᠮᠤᠨ	Улаанзээсэн суман	652829202
Qehen Nur Township (Qekinnur)	才坎诺尔乡	Cáikǎnnuò'ěr Xiāng	چېكىننۇر يېزىسى	chëkinnur yëzisi	ᠴᠡᠭᠡᠨᠨᠠᠭᠤᠷ ᠰᠤᠮᠤᠨ	Цгэннуур суман	652829203
Qagan Nur Township (Qakannur)	查干诺尔乡	Chágànnuò'ěr Xiāng	چاغاننۇر يېزىسى	chaghannur yëzisi	ᠴᠠᠭᠠᠨᠨᠠᠭᠤᠷ ᠰᠤᠮᠤᠨ	Цагааннуур суман	652829204
Bostnur Township (Bagrax Township)	博斯腾湖乡	Bósīténghú Xiāng	باغراش يېزىسى	baghrash yëzisi	ᠪᠣᠰᠲᠣᠨᠠᠭᠤᠷ ᠰᠤᠮᠤᠨ	Бостнуур суман	652829205

Other:

- XPCC 25th Regiment Farm (兵团二十五团, 25-تۇەن مەيدانى)

== Demographics ==
The proportion of nationalities in Bohu (Bagrax) County, 2018
Nationality	Percentage
Han People	61.8%
Uyghurs	18.3%
Hui People	11.4%
Mongols	7.2%
Others	1.3%
Source of the population statistics :
