= Xindi Township, Hebei =

Xindi Township
- Subdistrict

Chinese transcription(s)
  - Chinese: 新地乡
  - Pinyin: Xīndì Xiāng
- Interactive map of Xindi Township
- Coordinates: 41°53′33.504″N 118°15′56.052″E
- Country: China
- Province: Hebei
- Prefecture: Chengde
- County: Weichang
- Time zone: UTC+8 (China Standard Time)

Xindi Township (Chinese: 新地乡; pinyin: Xīndì Xiāng) is a township-level division situated in Weichang Manchu and Mongol Autonomous County, Chengde, Hebei, China.

== See also ==
- List of township-level divisions of Hebei
