= Bayingolin Mongol Autonomous Prefecture =

- Autonomous prefecture

Name transcription(s)
  - Chinese: 巴音郭楞蒙古自治州
  - Uyghur: بايىنغولىن موڭغۇل ئاپتونوم ئوبلاستى
  - Mongolian: ᠪᠠᠶᠠᠨᠭᠣᠣᠯ ᠮᠣᠩᠭᠣᠯ ᠥᠪᠡᠷᠲᠡᠭᠡᠨ ᠵᠠᠰᠠᠬᠤ ᠵᠧᠦ
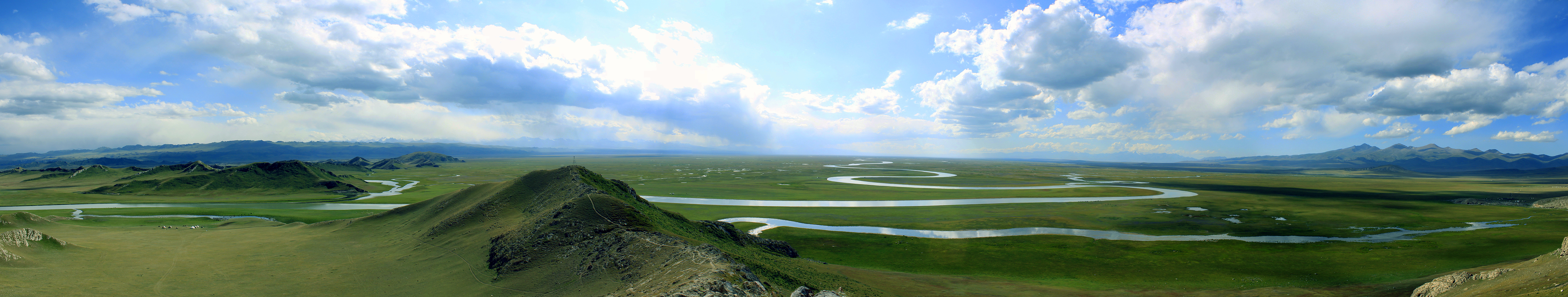
- Bayanbulak Grassland National Nature Reserve

- Bayingolin (red) in Xinjiang (orange)
- Coordinates: 42°N 86°E
- Country: China
- Autonomous region: Xinjiang
- Prefectural seat: Korla

Government
  - Body: Bayingolin Mongol Autonomous Prefecture People's Congress
  - Party Secretary: Li Gang
  - Congress Chairman: Purba Tugjegafu

Area
  - Total: 471,480.28 km^{2} (182,039.55 sq mi)

Population (2020)
  - Total: 1,509,233
  - Density: 3.201052/km^{2} (8.290687/sq mi)

GDP (nominal) (2025)
  - Total: CN¥ 172.4 billion US$ 24.1 billion
  - Per capita: CN¥ 117,502; US$ 16,450
- Time zone: UTC+8 (China Standard)
- ISO 3166 code: CN-XJ-28
- Website: www.xjbz.gov.cn

Bayingolin Mongol Autonomous Prefecture

Chinese name
- Chinese: 巴音郭楞蒙古自治州
Transcriptions
Standard Mandarin
- Hanyu Pinyin: Bāyīnguōléng Měnggǔ Zìzhìzhōu
- Wade–Giles: Pa¹-yin¹-kuo¹-lêng² Mêng³-ku³ Tzŭ⁴-chih⁴-chou¹
other Mandarin
- Xiao'erjing: بَاءٍقُوَلٍْ مٍْ‌قُ زِجِ‌جِوْ

Abbreviation
- Chinese: 巴音郭楞州 / 巴州
- Literal meaning: Bayingolin Prefecture
Transcriptions
Standard Mandarin
- Hanyu Pinyin: Bāyīnguōléng Zhōu / Bāzhōu

Mongolian name
- Mongolian Cyrillic: Баянгол – Монголын өөртөө засах жуу
- Mongolian script: ᠪᠠᠶᠠᠨᠭᠣᠣᠯ ᠮᠣᠩᠭᠣᠯ ᠥᠪᠡᠷᠲᠡᠭᠡᠨ ᠵᠠᠰᠠᠬᠤ ᠵᠧᠦ
Transcriptions
- SASM/GNC: Bayanγool mongγol öbertegen ǰasaqu ǰëü

Uyghur name
- Uyghur: بايىنغولىن موڭغۇل ئاپتونوم ئوبلاستى
Transcriptions
- Latin Yëziqi: Bayingholin Mongghol Aptonom Oblasti
- Yengi Yeziⱪ: Bayingⱨolin Mongƣul Aptonom 'Oblasti
- Siril Yëziqi: Байиңһолин Моңғул Аптоном 'Области

Oirat name
- Oirat: ᡋᠠᡕᠠᠨᡎᡆᠯ ᡏᡆᡊᡎᡆᠯ ᡄᡋᡄᠷᡄᡃᠨ ᠴᠠᠰᠠᡍᡇ ᡓᡇᡉ; Bayanɣol Mongɣol Eberēn Zasaxu J̌uu

Bayingolin

Chinese name
- Chinese: 巴音郭楞
- Literal meaning: rich river (from Mongolian)
Transcriptions
Standard Mandarin
- Hanyu Pinyin: Bāyīnguōléng
other Mandarin
- Xiao'erjing: بَاءٍقُوَلٍْ

Mongolian name
- Mongolian Cyrillic: Баянгол
- Mongolian script: ᠪᠠᠶᠠᠨᠭᠣᠣᠯ
Transcriptions
- SASM/GNC: Bayanγool

Uyghur name
- Uyghur: بايىنغولىن
Transcriptions
- Latin Yëziqi: Bayingholin
- Yengi Yeziⱪ: Bayingⱨolin
- Siril Yëziqi: Байиңһолин

Oirat name
- Oirat: ᡋᠠᡕᠠᠨᡎᡆᠯ; Bayanɣol

Bayingolin Mongol Autonomous Prefecture is an autonomous prefecture in the southeastern Xinjiang, China. It borders Gansu to the east, Qinghai to the southeast and the Tibet Autonomous Region to the south. It is the largest prefecture-level division nationally, with an area of 471,480 km^{2} (182,040 sq mi), which is even larger than its neighboring province of Gansu. The prefectural capital is Korla. Despite being designated an autonomous area for Mongols in China, only about four percent of Bayingolin's population is Mongol.

== History ==
In a 2017 announcement from officials in Bayingolin Mongol Autonomous Prefecture, it was proclaimed that "there is a severe threat from international terrorism, and cars have been used as a key means of transport for terrorists as well as constantly serving as weapons. It is therefore necessary to monitor and track all vehicles in the prefecture."

== Economy ==
As of 2025, Bayingolin had a GDP of CN¥172.353 billion (US$24.129 billion) and a GDP per capita of CN¥117,502 (US$16,450).

== Demographics ==
As of the 2020 census, Bayingolin had 1,509,233 inhabitants, 53.3% of whom were Han Chinese, 36.4% Uyghur, 5.3% Hui and 4.0% Mongol.

When Bayingolin was established in 1954, Mongols comprised 35 per cent of the prefecture's population. However, due to migration from elsewhere in China and the incorporation of Korla and a vast tract of the Tarim Basin, where few Mongols resided, into Bayingolin in 1960, the Han population increased from 1,682 in 1947 to over 660,000 by 2004.

Ethnic composition of Bayingolin: 2000, 2010, and 2015 censuses
Nationality	2000		2010		2015	
Nationality	Population	%	Population	%	Population	%
Han Chinese	607,774	58.05%	757,983	59.29%	826,063	59.27%
Uyghur	345,595	33.01%	406,942	31.83%	440,283	31.59%
Hui	52,252	4.99%	60,451	4.73%	64,979	4.66%
Mongol	43,544	4.16%	43,484	3.40%	50,091	3.59%
Tujia			2,336	0.18%		
Miao			1,362	0.11%		
Dongxiang			1,148	0.09%		
Kazakhs			1,091	0.09%		
Manchu			888	0.07%		
Other	7,805	0.74%	2,801	0.22%	12,396	0.89%
Total	1,046,970	100%	1,278,486	100%	1,393,812	100%

== Subdivisions ==
Bayingolin directly controls one county-level city, seven counties and one Hui autonomous county.

Name	Simplified Chinese	Hanyu Pinyin	Uyghur (UEY)	Uyghur Latin (ULY)	Mongolian	Mongolian (Cyrillic) (Pinyin)	Population (2020 Census)	Area (km^{2})	Density (/km^{2})
Korla	库尔勒市	Kù'ěrlè Shì	كورلا شەھىرى	Korla Shehiri	ᠺᠦᠷᠡᠯ᠎ᠡ ᠬᠣᠲᠠ	Хорол хот Qorol qota	779,352	7,378	105.63
Luntai County (Bügür)	轮台县	Lúntái Xiàn	بۈگۈر ناھىيىسى	Bügür Nahiyisi	ᠪᠦᠭᠦᠷ ᠰᠢᠶᠠᠨ	Бүхэр шянь Bükher siyan	137,327	14,182	9.68
Yuli County (Lopnur)	尉犁县	Yùlí Xiàn	لوپنۇر ناھىيىسى	Lopnur Nahiyisi	ᠯᠣᠪ ᠨᠠᠭᠤᠷ ᠰᠢᠶᠠᠨ	Лобнуур шянь Lobnaγur siyan	101,866	59,192	1.72
Ruoqiang County (Charqilik)	若羌县	Ruòqiāng Xiàn	چاقىلىق ناھىيىسى	Chaqiliq Nahiyisi	ᠴᠠᠬᠠᠯᠢᠬ ᠰᠢᠶᠠ	Чакилик шянь Čaqaliq siyan	43,045	198,322	0.22
Qiemo County (Cherchen)	且末县	Qiěmò Xiàn	چەرچەن ناھىيىسى	Cherchen Nahiyisi	ᠴᠠᠷᠴᠠᠨ ᠰᠢᠶᠠᠨ	Черчен шянь Čerčen siyan	69,236	138,665	0.50
Hejing County	和静县	Héjìng Xiàn	خېجىڭ ناھىيىسى	Xéjing Nahiyisi	ᠾᠧᠵᠢᠩ ᠰᠢᠶᠠᠨ	Хэжин шянь Hëǰing siyan	147,859	34,979	4.23
Hoxud County	和硕县	Héshuò Xiàn	خوشۇت ناھىيىسى	Xoshut Nahiyisi	ᠬᠣᠱᠤᠳ ᠰᠢᠶᠠᠨ	Хошууд шянь Qušud siyan	59,299	12,740	4.65
Bohu County	博湖县	Bóhú Xiàn	باغراش ناھىيىسى	Baghrash Nahiyisi	ᠪᠣᠰᠲᠠ ᠨᠠᠭᠤᠷ ᠰᠢᠶᠠᠨ	Бостнуур шянь Busdunaγur siyan	48,288	3,593	13.44
Yanqi Hui Autonomous County	焉耆回族自治县	Yānqí Huízú Zìzhìxiàn	يەنجى خۇيزۇ ئاپتونوم ناھىيىسى	Yenji Xuyzu Aptonom Nahiyisi	ᠶᠠᠨᠼᠢ ᠬᠣᠲᠣᠩ ᠥᠪᠡᠷᠲᠡᠭᠡᠨ ᠵᠠᠰᠠᠬᠤ ᠰᠢᠶᠠᠨ	Яньци – Хотон өөртөө засах шянь Yanči qotong öbertegen ǰasaqu siyan	122,961	2,429	52.62

== Notable persons ==
- Mihrigul Tursun

== See also ==
- Lop Nur
- Torghut
