= Karabulak =

Karabulak may refer to:

Places

- Karabulak, Azerbaijan, alternative name of several localities in Azerbaijan
- Karabulak, Kazakhstan, an urban-type settlement in Kazakhstan
- Karabulak (South Kazakhstan), a village in Kazakhstan
- Kara-Bulak, several villages in Kyrgyzstan
- Karabulak Urban Okrug, a municipal formation which the town of republic significance of Karabulak in the Republic of Ingushetia, Russia is incorporated as
- Karabulak, Russia, several inhabited localities in Russia
- Karabulak Township (哈拉布拉克乡), a township of Akqi County in Xinjiang Uygur Autonomous Region, China.
- Karabulak, Kulp

Other

- Karabulak, Russian name (exonym) for a historical Nakh people, the Orstkhoy.

== See also ==
- Karabulag, former name of the town of Shaghik, Armenia
- Karabulag, until 1946, name of the town of Yernjatap, Armenia
- Karabulag, until 1905, name of the town of Füzuli, Azerbaijan
- Karabulag, alternative name of Qareh Bolagh, a village in East Azerbaijan Province, Iran
- Qarabulaq (disambiguation)
