= Qarabulaq =

Qarabulaq (also, Garabulag) may refer to:

- Qarabolaq, Wakhan District, Badakhshan Province, Afghanistan
- Qarabulaq, Almaty, Kazakhstan
- Gömür, Shabran, Azerbaijan
- Qarabulaq, Gadabay, Azerbaijan
- Qarabulaq, Gobustan, Azerbaijan
- Qarabulaq, Goygol, Azerbaijan
- Qarabulaq, Khizi, Azerbaijan
- Qarabulaq, Khojali, Azerbaijan
- Qarabulaq, Oghuz, Azerbaijan
- Qarabulaq, Quba, Azerbaijan
- Qarabulaq, Shusha, Azerbaijan
- Qarabulaq, East Azerbaijan, Iran
- Qarabulaq, Zanjan, Iran
- Qarabulaq, Abhar, Zanjan Province, Iran

== See also ==
- Karabulak (disambiguation)
- Qarah Bolagh (disambiguation)
