= Small Ingush =

Historical Ingush ethnoterritorial society

Small Ingush or Little Angusht, also District of Sholkhi, were a historical Ingush ethnoterritorial society that existed during the 18-19th centuries. The center of the society was the village of Sholkhi.

== History ==
=== Formation of the society ===
The Soviet and Russian historian Nataliya Volkova gives the 60s of the 18th century as the date of the emergence of Small Ingush, when part of the Ingush – the inhabitants of the Tarskaya Valley, having advanced through the mountain defile separating the river Kambileyevka from the plain, occupied both banks of this river in the Shaulokha tract. This is also confirmed by Julius Klaproth, who notes that the settlements of the Small Ingush were formed by the Ingush who migrated from the mountains about 40 years ago. German lieutenant-general Johann Blaramberg, as a result of his expedition in the Caucasus mountains in the 1830s, stated that the colony Shalkha (Small Ingush) formed about 70 years ago (in 1770s) which matches with the information of Julius Klaproth.

=== General information ===
Small Ingush are first mentioned in the work of the German academian J. A. Güldenstädt in 1770-1773 as the District of Sholkhi, which according to J. A. Güldenstädt is called "Little Angusht" (Small Ingush) by the Russians due to its proximity to Angusht proper.

In 1773, the head of the missionary commission A. Lebedev's trip to the Small and Great Ingush, was caused by complaints of the local Ingush population about the oppression by the Kabardian princes. Reporting the results of his trip to the Kizlyar commandant Shtender, A. Lebedev noted that the consequence of these oppressions was the partial resettlement of the inhabitants of the Lesser Ingush to the Greater Ingush. However, even after 1773, Shteder, who visited here in 1781, found the settlements of the Small Ingush in the same places. L. L. Städer mentioned the Small Ingush as the Ingush colony of Shalkha situated on the Kumbaley river, he also mentioned that the colony was able to drop every attempt of Kabardians to impose their tribute on them thanks to their courage and the strength of the people. In 1821, the German geographer and statistician Georg Hassel, in his geographical description of the Russian Empire and Dshagatai also mentioned the Small Ingush as the District of Shalkha when enlisting a total number of territorial divisions of the Ingush people. In 1823, S. M. Bronevsky in his work The latest geographical and historical news about the Caucasus mentioned Small Ingush as Shalka or Small Angusht situated on the lower reaches of river Kumbaley.

== Composition ==
Great and Small Ingush consisted of following settlements and districts: Galga, Tirol, Aka, Betsi, Gemir, Vaurukhu, Kir, Meresh, Golay, Ialkhar, Tsoray, Noy, Khoy, Kakhkoy, Mestoy, Nashakh, Tsuluy, Meler, Korbi, Makhshi, Assay, Shadgia, Asday, Kheyrekhi, Tsidsi, Palang.

== Bibliography ==
- Волкова, Н. Г. (1974). Гарданов, В. К. (ed.). Этнический состав населения Северного Кавказа в XVIII — начале XX века [Ethnic composition of the population of the North Caucasus in the 18th - early 20th centuries] (in Russian). Москва: Наука. pp. 1–276.
- Гюльденштедт, Иоганн Антон (2002). "VI. Провинция Кистия, или Кистетия" [VI. Province of Kistia, or Kistetia]. In Карпов, Ю. Ю. (ed.). Путешествие по Кавказу в 1770-1773 гг. [Journey through the Caucasus in 1770-1773.] (in Russian). Translated by Шафроновской, Т. К. Санкт-Петербург: Петербургское Востоковедение. pp. 238–243. ISBN 5-85803-213-3.
- Штедер, Л. Л. (2016). Дневник путешествия из пограничной крепости Моздок во внутренние местности Кавказа, предпринятого в 1781 году [Diary of a journey from the border fortress of Mozdok to the interior of the Caucasus, undertaken in 1781] (in Russian and Ossetic). Translated by Иванова, Л. М.; Амбалов, Ц. Владикавказ: СОИГСИ ВНЦ РАН. pp. 1–368. ISBN 978-5-91480-271-1.
- Hassel, Georg (1821). Vollständige und neueste Erdbeschreibung des Russischen Reichs in Asia, nebst Dshagatai, mit einer Einleitung zur Statistik des Russischen Asiens, nebst des Dshagatischen Reichs [Complete and most recent geography of the Russian Empire in Asia, along with Dshagatai, with an introduction to the statistics of Russian Asia, along with the Dshagatic Empire] (in German). Vol. 12: Vollständiges Handbuch der neuesten Erdbeschreibung. Weimar: Verlag des geographischen Instituts. pp. 1–896.
- Броневский, С. М. (1823). "Кисты (глава третья)" [Kists (chapter three)]. Новейшие географические и исторические известия о Кавказе (часть вторая) [The latest geographical and historical news about the Caucasus (part two)] (PDF) (in Russian). Москва: Типография С. Селивановского. pp. 151–186.
- Волкова, Н. Г.; Анчабадзе, Ю. Д. (1993). Симченко, Ю. Б. (ed.). Народы Кавказа [Peoples of the Caucasus] (in Russian). Москва: ИЭИА. pp. 1–265. ISSN 0868-586X.
- Бларамберг, И. Ф. (2010). Историческое, топографическое, статистическое, этнографическое и военное описание Кавказа [Historical, topographical, statistical, ethnographic and military description of the Caucasus] (in Russian). Translated by Назарова, И. М. Москва: Надыршин. pp. 1–402. ISBN 978-5-902744-10-8.
