= Karabulak, Azerbaijan =

Garabulag, Azerbaijan or Karabulag, Azerbaijan or Gharabulagh, Azerbaijan or Ghrabulagh, Azerbaijan or Karbulag, Azerbaijan or Qarabulaq, Azerbaijan or Karabulakh, Azerbaijan or Gharaboulagh, Azerbaijan may refer to:

- Gömür, Davachi
- Qarabulaq, Gadabay
- Qarabulaq, Gobustan
- Qarabulaq, Goygol
- Qarabulaq, Khizi
- Qarabulaq, Khojali
- Qarabulaq, Oghuz
- Qarabulaq, Quba
