= Siege of Tsori Tower (1832) =

1832 siege during the Caucasian War

Siege of the Tsori Tower
- Part of the Caucasian War
Date	Late June 1832
Location	Tsori, Ingushetia, North Caucasus
Result	Russian victory

Belligerents
Russian Empire	(Ingushetia) Ingush of Tsori society

Commanders and leaders
(Russian Empire) Baron G. V. Rosen (Russian Empire) Baron F. F. Tornau	Unknown (2 defenders)

Strength
~3,000	2 (in the tower)

Casualties and losses
3 killed, 11 wounded	2 captured

The Siege of the Tsori Tower (Russian: Осада Цоринской башни) took place in late June 1832 during the Caucasian War, as part of a larger punitive expedition conducted in July–August 1832. A Russian force under General Baron G. V. Rosen, numbering approximately 3,000 troops, was halted at the Ingush village of Tsori by two defenders barricaded in a stone defensive tower. After a three-day siege, during which artillery proved ineffective against the tower's walls, Russian sappers successfully mined the structure with five poods of gunpowder. The defenders surrendered after being offered terms, and the tower was subsequently destroyed. The expedition then proceeded to ravage Tsori before moving on to other Ingush and Karabulak settlements.

== Background ==
Tsori was a medieval aul and the historical center of the Tsorin society, located in the Dzheyrakhsky District of present-day Ingushetia. The village was situated at an elevation of approximately 1,170 meters above sea level in the Guloykhi gorge. Its architecture included three combat towers and more than thirty residential towers, as well as twelve burial crypts. Its position controlled the road descending into a valley suitable for a military encampment, making it a natural chokepoint.

In July–August 1832, the Ingush (Ghalghai) rose against Russian authority in the Caucasus. The immediate cause was the collaboration of some Ingush with Ghazi Muhammad, the leader of the Caucasian Imamate, and the murder of a Russian bailiff. In response, the Russian command dispatched a punitive expedition under the overall command of General Baron G. V. Rosen, with Baron F. F. Tornau serving as a staff officer and later chronicler of the campaign.

== Siege ==
As the Russian column approached Tsori in late June 1832, the main forces of the Ghalghai had entrenched themselves near Mount Gai (Khai) and organized a rockfall against the Russian equestrian avant-garde, halting forward movement. The column was then stopped at Tsori itself by fire from a defensive tower positioned on an isolated granite cliff, which completely commanded the road at the beginning of the descent into the valley.

=== The tower ===
The tower was a rectangular structure of the traditional Ingush type. Its doors, made of thick oak planks, were barricaded from the inside with stones and were located several meters above ground level, with no ladder providing access. Narrow embrasures pierced in all directions allowed the defenders to fire in every direction. The Russians could not determine how many men were inside due to the silence, broken only by rare shots.

Baron Tornau later described the situation in his memoirs:

Along the road passed the question: 'Why are they standing in front?' We waited a long time until the same question came back: 'The enemy won't let us pass.' With no small difficulty we reached a rifle-shot's distance from the head of the column, but were forced to stop there. Two shots ahead, above the road itself, a tall quadrangular tower of construction familiar to us was visible, because we had already blown up several of them.

=== Initial attempts ===
The Russians first attempted to encircle the tower. Two companies of the Erivan Regiment were sent across the mountain by a path discovered by local Ossetians, who served as guides for the expedition. A skirmish line was deployed behind stones and in nearby saklyas (dwellings), with firing ports cut facing the tower. However, the defenders shot with such accuracy that, in Tornau's words, "a soldier dared not show his head, his hand, or a piece of his coat without the fear of being immediately pierced by a bullet".

An attempt was then made to breach the tower's doors with artillery, but it was soon concluded that three-pound grenades were completely powerless against them. The tower's stone walls, built according to centuries-old local techniques, proved resistant to the field artillery of the period.

=== Mining and surrender ===
After three days of siege, during which three Russian soldiers were killed and eleven wounded, the Russians resorted to mining. Five poods (approximately 82 kg) of gunpowder were packed into a strong, iron-bound box and placed in the tower's cellar. The defenders made desperate efforts to stop the work: they breached the cellar vault and fired at the sappers working on the mine, but were unable to prevent the charge from being laid.

Baron Rosen several times offered the besieged men the opportunity to surrender, but each time they refused. When all was prepared for the explosion, Rosen sent word once more, urging the Ghalghai to spare themselves and promising them their lives and even an exchange of prisoners in case of capitulation. The defenders agreed, requesting two hours to clear the door of the stones blocking the exit.

At the appointed time, the Russian staff assembled at the tower. A company stood ready to receive the prisoners. The doors opened: first, half a dozen rifles were thrown out, then two ragged and dirty Ghalghai men descended by rope, crossing their arms on their chests and waiting for their fate. When asked through an interpreter where the others were and why they were not coming out, the answer was: "There were only us."

== Aftermath ==
The siege of Tsori cost the Russians three killed and eleven wounded, against two captured defenders. The following day, one of the prisoners escaped by pushing the soldier escorting him into a precipice.

After the capture of the tower, the Russians "ruined Tsori to its foundations" and proceeded to Shuani. During the expedition, several villages that had been abandoned by their inhabitants were destroyed, and several hundred head of "baranta" (cattle seized as plunder) were captured. The Tsori tower complex suffered significant damage during the campaign.

The expedition under General Rosen also targeted the Karabulak (Orstkhoy) village of Eban, which had joined the uprising. According to some accounts, Rosen attempted to transfer Eban's lands to neighboring mountain societies in order to sow internal discord, but they refused to occupy another's domain. In September 1832, General A. Velyaminov's forces advanced into Greater (Eastern) Chechnya, where heavy fighting followed.

The siege is notable for the disparity between the defenders two men and the attacking force of approximately 3,000 soldiers, and became a symbol of Ingush resistance in the Caucasian War.

== See also ==
- Caucasian War
- Ingushetia
- Tsori
