= Dizavar =

Dizavar may refer to:

- Dizəvər, Azerbaijan
- Dizavar, Iran
