= Night attack in Tsori =

Date	June 13, 1785
Location	Near Tsori, Dzheyrakhsky District
Result	Ingush Victory

Belligerents
Chechens	Tsorin Ingush

Commanders and leaders
Sheikh Mansur	Unknown

Strength
About 500	unknown

Casualties and losses
Heavy	unknown

The night attack in Tsori was a military engagement on 13 June 1785, when about 500 followers of Sheikh Mansur, carrying 13 banners, advanced on the Ingush village of Tsori (40 versts from Vladikavkaz) to sack it and, according to historian Nikolai Dubrovin, to search for "some ancient Quran, supposedly kept by the Ingush."

== Background ==
In the 1886 work "History of the War and Russian Dominion in the Caucasus," Nikolai Dubrovin writes:

"Fully relying on the prophet’s (Sheikh Mansur) words, many villages began to prepare for the campaign, sewed banners, and said they would go with Mansur to the Ingush, to convert them to Islam and to find some ancient Koran supposedly kept by the Ingush."

== Attack ==
On June 13, 1785, a party of Sheikh Mansur's supporters, consisting of 500 men with 13 banners, approached the Ingush village of Tsori, located high in the mountains 40 versts from Vladikavkaz, with the aim of destroying it. However, when this party, having stopped a few versts short of the village, camped for the night, the residents of Tsori, who had been informed of the approach of Mansur's forces, suddenly attacked them at night and drove them away.

The same party of Mansur's troops most likely attempted to attack the village of Sholkhi on the Ingush plain and the fortress of Vladikavkaz. Lieutenant General Leontiev, in his report to Lieutenant General P.S. Potemkin dated June 24, 1785, reported the failure of the attacking force led by Mansur, which befell them during the attacks on the Ingush villages and on the Ingush herds grazing under the fortress of Vladikavkaz.
