= Kulansarak =

Kulansarak 库兰萨日克乡 (Chinese) قۇلانساراق يېزىسى (Uyghur) قۇلانساراق ايىلى (Kyrgyz) Kulansarike
- Township
- Location of the township
- Coordinates: 41.0255315618°N 78.7015309465°E
- Country: People's Republic of China
- Autonomous region: Xinjiang
- Prefecture: Kizilsu
- County: Akqi
- Seat: Jildiz Village (Jiledesi; 吉勒得斯村)

Area
  - Total: 1,954 km^{2} (754 sq mi)

Population (2010 Census)
  - Total: 4,498
  - Density: 2.302/km^{2} (5.962/sq mi)

Ethnic groups
  - Major ethnic groups: Kyrgyz
- Time zone: UTC+8 (China Standard Time)
- Website: www.xjahq.gov.cn/ahqtown.htm

Kulansarak (Kulansa rak; also as Kulansarike; simplified Chinese: 库兰萨日克乡; traditional Chinese: 庫蘭薩日克鄉; pinyin: Kùlánsàrìkè Xiāng) is a township of Akqi County in Xinjiang Uygur Autonomous Region, China. Located in the northeast of the county, it covers an area of 1,594 kilometres with a population of 4,498 (2010 Census), the main ethnic group is Kyrgyz. The township has 5 administrative villages (as of 2018) and 9 unincorporated villages under jurisdiction, its seat is at Jildiz Village (吉勒得斯).

== Name ==
The name of Kulansa rak is from the Kyrgyz language, meaning yellow grass beach with wild horses (野马的黄草滩). It is said that the township was so named because there were wild horses that lived here. The township is located in the northeast of the county, 33 kilometers northeast of the county seat Akqi Town.

== History ==
It was formerly part of the 1st district in 1950, Hulangshan Commune (虎狼山公社) was established in 1958. Kulansarak Commune was created in 1962. It was renamed to Xiangyang Commune (向阳公社) in 1969 during the Cultural Revolution. In 1978, the commune was renamed Kulansarak Commune. It was organized as a township in 1984.

== Administrative divisions ==
Kulansarak includes 5 villages:

- Aqtektir Village (Aketeketi'ercun) (阿克特克提尔村, ئاقتېكتىر كەنتى, اقتەكتىر قىشتاعى)
  - 41°01′02″N 078°40′18″E
- Ainiqkekir Village (Ayinikekake'ercun) (阿依尼克喀克尔村, ئېنىق كېكىر كەنتى, اينىقكەكىر قىشتاعى)
- Bedel Village (Biedielicun) (别迭里村, بەدەل كەنتى, بەدەل قىشتاعى)
- Jildiz Village (Jiledesicun) (吉勒得斯村, جىلدىز كەنتى, جىلدىز قىشتاعى)
  - 41°01′47″N 078°42′03″E
- Ozonkuch Village (玉山古西村, ئۆزىنكۈچ كەنتى, ۅزۅنكۉچ قىشتاعى)

== Economy ==
The main industries in the township are planting and animal husbandry, wheat, corn, broad beans, hemp and rape are the main products. It is one of the main grain and edible oil producing areas in the county. There are roads link to the provincial road S306 (省道306).

== Demographics ==
Historical population
| Year | Pop. | ±% p.a. |
|---|---|---|
| 2000 | 2,850 | — |
| 2010 | 4,498 | +4.67% |

As of 1997, 99.29% of the population of Kulansarak was Kyrgyz.

== Transportation ==
- Road to the Bedel Pass on the China–Kyrgyzstan border passes through the township
