= Somtax =

Somtax 苏木塔什乡 (Chinese) سومتاش يېزىسى (Uyghur) سومتاش ايىلى (Kyrgyz) Sumutashi
- Township
- Location of the township
- Coordinates: 40.8959900305°N 78.2430521109°E
- Country: People's Republic of China
- Autonomous region: Xinjiang
- Prefecture: Kizilsu
- County: Akqi

Area
  - Total: 1,848 km^{2} (714 sq mi)

Population (2017)
  - Total: 5,086
- Time zone: UTC+8 (China Standard Time)
- Website: www.xjahq.gov.cn/ahqtown.htm

Somtax (Somtash also as Sumutashi; simplified Chinese: 苏木塔什乡; traditional Chinese: 蘇木塔什鄉; pinyin: Sūmùtǎshí Xiāng) is a township of Akqi County in Xinjiang Uygur Autonomous Region, China. Located in the middle of the county, it covers an area of 1,848 kilometres with a population of 5,086 (as of 2017), the main ethnic group is Kyrgyz. The township has 4 administrative villages (as of 2018) and 10 unincorporated villages under jurisdiction, its seat is at Aktala Village (阿合塔拉).

The name of som tax was from the Kyrgyz language, meaning "rectangular stone" (长方形石头). Here the rocks are mostly rectangular, the place is named after it. The township is located in the middle of the county, 20 kilometers west of the county seat Akqi Town.

== History ==
It was formerly part of the 1st district in 1950 and the 2nd district in 1954, Somtax Commune (苏木塔什公社) was established in 1958, it was renamed to Quanwudi Commune (全无敌公社) and its seat was moved to Aktala (阿合塔拉) from Somtax (苏木塔什) in 1969. Its name was back to Somtax Commune in 1978, and the commune was re-organized as a township in 1984.

== Administrative divisions ==
- Aqtala Village (阿合塔拉村, ئاقتالا كەنتى, اقتالا قىشتاعى)
- Kong'urach Village (孔吾拉奇村, كۆڭئورۇچ كەنتى, كۅڭورۇۇچ قىشتاعى)
- Qizilgumbez Village (克孜勒宫拜孜村, قىزىل گۈمبەز كەنتى, قىزىل كۉمبۅز قىشتاعى)
- Somtash Village (苏木塔什村, سومتاش كەنتى, سومتاش قىشتاعى)

== Overview ==
Somtax is known as the land of falcons in China; Jilusu Hot Spring (吉鲁苏温泉) is an important holiday destination. The township is located in the southwest of the county. Animal husbandry is its main industry, combined with agriculture. The main crops are wheat, barley, corn, broad beans, hemp and rape. The provincial road S306 (省道306) passes through the township.
