= Karaqi =

Karaqi 哈拉奇乡 (Chinese) قاراچى يېزىسى (Uyghur) قاراچئي ايىلى (Kyrgyz) Halaqi
- Township
- Location of the township
- Coordinates: 40.8402273668°N 77.9428694818°E
- Country: People's Republic of China
- Autonomous region: Xinjiang
- Prefecture: Kizilsu
- County: Akqi

Area
  - Total: 2,929 km^{2} (1,131 sq mi)

Population (2017)
  - Total: 9,085
- Time zone: UTC+8 (China Standard Time)
- Website: www.xjahq.gov.cn/ahqtown.htm

Karaqi (also as Halaqi; Chinese: 哈拉奇乡; pinyin: Hǎlāqí Xiāng) is a township of Akqi County in Xinjiang Uygur Autonomous Region, China. Located in the southwest of the county, it covers an area of 2,929 kilometres with a population of 8,010 (2010 Census), the main ethnic group is Kyrgyz. The township has a community, 3 administrative villages (as of 2018) and 8 unincorporated villages under jurisdiction, its seat is at Karaqi Village (哈拉奇).

The name of Karaqi was from the Kyrgyz language, meaning dark green achnatherum calamagrostis (黑芨芨草). The township is located in the southwest of the county, 45 kilometers west of the county seat Akqi Town.

== History ==
It was formerly part of the 2nd district in 1950 and the 3rd district in 1954, Karaqi Commune (哈拉奇公社) was established in 1958, and renamed to Fanxiu Commune (反修公社), Karaqi Commune in 1978. It was organized as a township in 1984.

== Administrative divisions ==
- Unity Road (Tuanjielu) Community (团结路社区, ئىتتىپاق يولى مەھەللىسى, ىنتىماق جولۇ قوومدۇق قونۇشۇ)
- Aqchi Village (阿合奇村, ئاقچى كەنتى, اقچئي قىشتاعى)
- Bulung Village (布隆村, بۇلۇڭ كەنتى, بۇلۇڭ قىشتاعى)
- Qarachi Village (哈拉奇村, قاراچى كەنتى, قاراچئي قىشتاعى)

== Overview ==
The township is located in the southwest of the county. Animal husbandry is its main industry, combined with agriculture. There are about 80,000 livestock all year round, the main crops are wheat, hemp and rapeseed. The provincial road S306 (省道306) passes through the township.
