= Musabekov =

Musabekov may refer to:

- Firdavsbek Musabekov, Uzbekistani Paralympic swimmer
- Gazanfar Musabekov, Soviet politician
- Zəhmətkənd, Azerbaijan
