= Gomur =

Gomur may refer to:

- Gemer (village), Slovakia
- Gomk, village in Armenia

== See also ==
- Gömür (disambiguation)
