= Aktuma =

Aktuma Ақтұма
- Village
- Location in Kazakhstan Aktuma (Asia)
- Coordinates: 45°17′50″N 79°4′0″E
- Country: Kazakhstan
- Region: Jetisu Region
- District: Eskeldi District

Population (2009)
  - Total: 202
- Time zone: UTC+6 (Omsk Time)

Aktuma (Kazakh: Ақтұма, Aqtūma) is a village in Jetisu Region of south-eastern Kazakhstan.
