= Karabulak Township =

Karabulak 哈拉布拉克乡 (Chinese) قارابۇلاق يېزىسى (Uyghur) قارابۇلاق ايىلى (Kyrgyz) Halabulake
- Township
- Location of the township
- Coordinates: 40.7874931551°N 77.5803813907°E
- Country: People's Republic of China
- Autonomous region: Xinjiang
- Prefecture: Kizilsu
- County: Akqi

Area
  - Total: 2,812 km^{2} (1,086 sq mi)

Population (2017)
  - Total: 6,466
- Time zone: UTC+8 (China Standard Time)
- Website: www.xjahq.gov.cn/ahqtown.htm

Karabulak (Ka rabulak; also as Halabulake; Chinese: 哈拉布拉克乡; pinyin: Hǎlābùlākè Xiāng) is a township of Akqi County in Xinjiang Uygur Autonomous Region, China. Located in the west of the county, it covers an area of 2,811 kilometres with a population of 7,361 (2010 Census), the main ethnic group is Kyrgyz. The township has 7 administrative villages (as of 2018) and 13 unincorporated villages under jurisdiction, its seat is at Karabulak Village (哈拉布拉克).

The name of Ka Rabulak was from the Kyrgyz language, meaning clear spring (清泉). The township is located in the west of the county, 84 kilometers west of the county seat Akqi Town.

== History ==
It was formerly part of the 2nd district in 1950 and the 3rd district in 1954, Karabulak Commune (哈拉布拉克公社) was established in 1962, and renamed to Weidong Commune (卫东公社), Karabulak Commune in 1978. It was organized as a township in 1984.

== Administrative divisions ==
- Aqbashat Village (阿克巴夏特村, ئاقباشات كەنتى, اقباشات قىشتاعى)
- Aq'ongkur Village (阿克翁库尔村, ئاقئۆڭكۈر كەنتى, اقۉڭكۉر قىشتاعى)
- Boztala Village (博孜塔拉村, بوزتالا كەنتى, بوزتالا قىشتاعى)
- Keltebek Village (凯利特别克村, كەلتېبېك كەنتى, كەلتەبەك قىشتاعى)
- Merkech Village (麦尔开其村, مەركەچ كەنتى, مەركەچ قىشتاعى)
- Qarabulaq Village (哈拉布拉克村, قارابۇلاق كەنتى, قارابۇلاق قىشتاعى)
- Qursay Village (库尔萨依村, قۇرساي كەنتى, قۇرساي قىشتاعى)

== Overview ==
The township is located in the west of the county, the upper reaches of Taushgan River (托什干河). The main industries in the township are mainly animal husbandry and agriculture. There are 70,000 livestock in stock all year round in the township, the main crops are highland barley, barley, hemp, rapeseed and so on. In the west, there is the site of the ancient Barergendi Fort (巴勒根迪古炮台遗址). There are roads link to Karaqi Township.
