= Saparbay =

Saparbay 色帕巴依乡 (Chinese) ساپارباي يېزىسى (Uyghur) ساپارباي ايىلى (Kyrgyz) Sepabayi
- Township
- Location of the township
- Coordinates: 40.9759033201°N 78.7005793765°E
- Country: People's Republic of China
- Autonomous region: Xinjiang
- Prefecture: Kizilsu
- County: Akqi

Area
  - Total: 2,066 km^{2} (798 sq mi)

Population (2010 Census)
  - Total: 3,004
- Time zone: UTC+8 (China Standard Time)
- Website: www.xjahq.gov.cn/ahqtown.htm

Saparbay (also as Sepabayi; Chinese: 色帕巴依乡; pinyin: Sèpàbāyī Xiāng) is a township of Akqi County in Xinjiang Uygur Autonomous Region, China. Located in the east of the county, it covers an area of 2,066 kilometres with a population of 3,004 (2010 Census), the main ethnic group is Kyrgyz. The township has 3 administrative villages (as of 2018) and 7 unincorporated villages under jurisdiction, its seat is at Saparbay Village (色帕巴依).

The name of "Saparbay" was from the Kyrgyz language, meaning "traffic main artery" (交通要道). The township is located in the east of the county, 25 kilometers east of the county seat Akqi Town.

== History ==
It was formerly part of the 1st district in 1950 and part of the Hulangshan Commune (虎狼山公社) in 1958, Saparbay Commune (色帕巴依公社) was established in 1962, it was renamed to Dongfanghong Commune (东方红公社) in 1969 and back to the name of Saparbay Commune in 1978, the commune was re-organized as a township in 1984.

== Administrative divisions ==
- Aq'oy Village (阿果依村, ئاقئوي كەنتى, اقۇي قىشتاعى)
- Qarabulung Village (喀拉布隆村, قارابۇلۇڭ كەنتى, قارابۇلۇڭ قىشتاعى)
- Saparbay Village (色帕巴依村, ساپارباي كەنتى, ساپارباي قىشتاعى)

== Overview ==
The township is located in the east of the county. agriculture and Animal husbandry are the main industries. The main crops are wheat, corn, vicia faba, sesame and rape. The provincial road S306 (省道306) passes through the township.
