= Karabulak, Russia =

Set index of articles associated with the same name

Karabulak (Russian: Карабулак) is the name of several inhabited localities in Russia.

Urban localities

- Karabulak, Republic of Ingushetia, a town in the Republic of Ingushetia; administratively incorporated as a town of republic significance

Rural localities

- Karabulak, Astrakhan Oblast, a settlement in Ozernovsky Selsoviet of Ikryaninsky District of Astrakhan Oblast
- Karabulak, Chelyabinsk Oblast, a settlement in Karabulaksky Selsoviet of Kizilsky District of Chelyabinsk Oblast
- Karabulak, Saratov Oblast, a settlement in Novoburassky District of Saratov Oblast
