= Gömür =

Gömür or Gyumyur” or Gemyur or Gëmyur may refer to:

- Gömür, Davachi, Azerbaijan
- Gömür, Nakhchivan, Azerbaijan
