= Khay (aul) =

Non-residential rural locality in Chechnya

Khay Хай
- Selo

Other transcription(s)
  - Chechen: Хьай
  - Ingush: Хьай
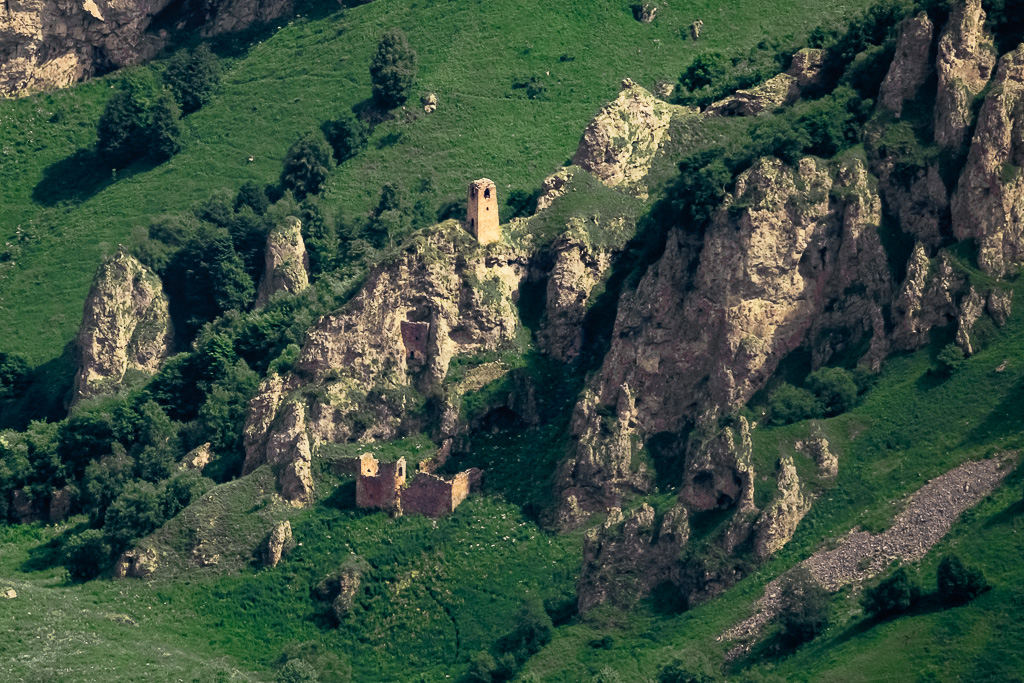
- Interactive map of Khay
- Location of Khay Khay (Chechnya)
- Coordinates: 42°52′52″N 45°05′17″E
- Country: Russia
- Federal subject: Chechnya

Population (2010 Census)
  - Total: 0
  - Estimate (2021): 0 )

Administrative status
  - Subordinated to: Achkhoy-Martanovsky District

Khay (Note: • Russian: Хай, romanized: Khay • Chechen: Хьай, romanized: Hay • Ingush: Хьай, romanized: Hay) is a medieval village (aul) in Achkhoy-Martanovsky District of the Republic of Chechnya, Russia (Until September 26, 2018, it was in the Sunzhensky District of Ingushetia).

== Geography ==
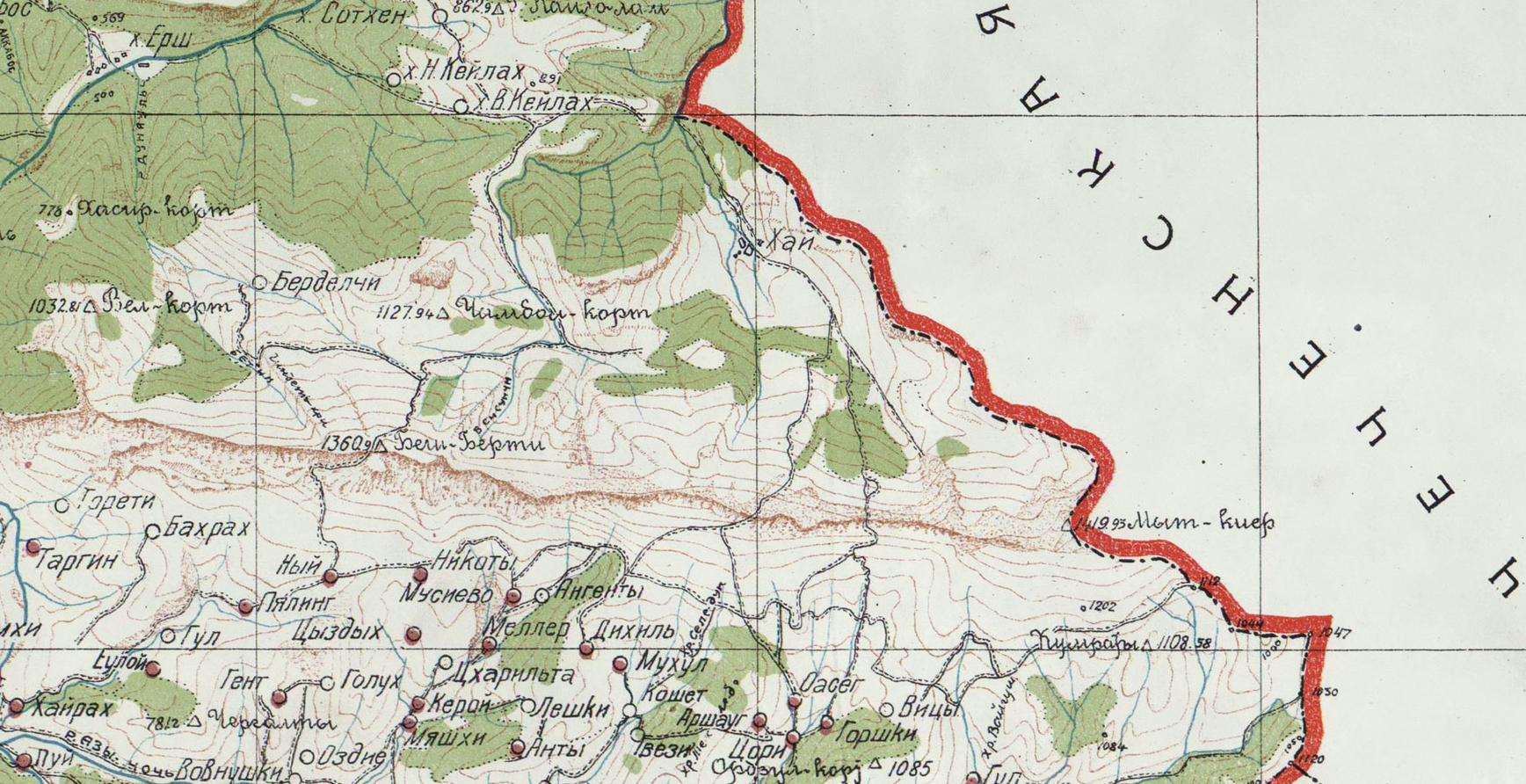
Khay (Хай) on a map of the Ingush Autonomous Oblast in 1928

Khay is located on the banks of the upper reaches of the Fortanga river, at the northern foot of mountains Khakhalga and Tsorey-Lama. The nearest settlements in the south – the village of Tsori, in the north-west – the village of Alkun, in the north-east – the village of Dattykh, in the east of Gazuni.

== History ==
In the second half of the 18th century (1770s), the German researcher J. A. Güldenstädt indicated the village of Khay among the total number of Ingush villages proper. Khay among the villages of the Ingush in 1823 was also mentioned by S. M. Bronevskiy. In 1832, Baron Rosen carried out a major military expedition to the mountainous part of Ingushetia. In reports to the Minister of War A. I. Chernyshev dated July 15, 21 and 29, 1832, Rosen reported that the actions of his detachment were directed against the Galgai, including the Khay (Gai) gorge, near the village of Tsori. In the memoirs of Baron Tornau of his 1832 campaign under Baron Rosen the mountain village of Khai (Gai) is mentioned as a pivotal point for the concentration of Galgai forces. From its commanding elevation, sustained rockfalls were directed against the advancing troops over several days, temporarily immobilizing the cavalry vanguard and demonstrating the tactical advantage of local terrain in the conflict.

According to the Regulations on the management of the Terek Oblast in 1862, the Ingushskiy Okrug was established as part of the Western Department. It included societies of Nazranians, Karabulaks, Galgai, Kistins, Akkins and Tsorins (also Meredzhin society and some Galanchozh and Yalkharoy auls). The village of Khai was part of the Galgai society of the Gorsky section of the Ingush district.

In 1870, administrative transformations were carried out in the Terek region. The Ingush and Ossetian Okrugs were merged into one Vladikavkazsky Okrug and, according to 1874, the village of Khay was part of the 3rd section, and its population was made up of Galgai. In 1883, 1890 and 1914 censuses, the population of Khay was also entirely Ingush.

As a result of the collapse of the Mountain ASSR on July 7, 1924, the Ingush Autonomous Oblast was formed. The village of Khay was part of the Assinovskiy Okrug of the Ingush Autonomous Oblast, with a common village council in the village of Tsori. In the aftermath of the 1917 Revolution, two Chechen households migrated to Khay as a consequence of an ongoing blood feud. According to the 1926 census the majority of the village were ethnic Chechens (23 people) while Ingush were became a minority (12 people).

The village was abandoned by the inhabitants during the deportation of 1944. After the return of the Chechens and Ingush to the Caucasus, the village was not populated. Mainly, the land of the village was used for apiary farming.

== Bibliography ==
- Кодзоев, Н. Д.; Киева, З. Х. (2021). Накостхоев, Х. А.; Хайрова, Р. Р. (eds.). Ономастикон Ингушетии [Onomasticon of Ingushetia] (in Russian). Москва: ТПК «Центробланк». pp. 1–121. ISBN 978-5-91303-022-1.
- Неравноценный обмен Ингушетии с Чечнёй: анализ картографов [The unequal exchange of Ingushetia with Chechnya: an analysis of cartographers]. Caucasian Knot Кавказский Узел (in Russian). 2018.
- Zheng, Junzhi (December 13, 2018). Ingouchie-Tchétchénie: l'accord de la discorde [Ingushetia-Chechnya: the agreement of discord] (in French). Orient XXI. Archived from the original (Article) on April 20, 2025.
- Гюльденштедт, Иоганн Антон (2002). "VI. Провинция Кистия, или Кистетия" [VI. Province of Kistia, or Kistetia]. In Карпов, Ю. Ю. (ed.). Путешествие по Кавказу в 1770–1773 гг. [Journey through the Caucasus in 1770–1773.] (in Russian). Translated by Шафроновской, Т. К. Санкт-Петербург: Петербургское Востоковедение. pp. 238–243. ISBN 5-85803-213-3.
- Броневский, С. М. (1823). "Кисты (глава третья)" [Kists (chapter three)]. Новейшие географические и исторические известия о Кавказе (часть вторая) [The latest geographical and historical news about the Caucasus (part two)] (PDF) (in Russian). Москва: Типография С. Селивановского. pp. 151–186.
- Парова, Л. М. (1995). Муталиев, Т. Х.-Б. (ed.). Акты Кавказской археографической комиссии об Ингушетии и ингушах [Acts of the Caucasian Archaeographic Commission on Ingushetia and the Ingush] (in Russian). Назрань. pp. 1–247.
- Картоев, М. М. (2020). Ингушетия в политике Российской империи на Кавказе. XIX век. Сборник документов и материалов [Ingushetia in the policy of the Russian Empire in the Caucasus. 19th century. Collection of documents and materials] (in Russian) (2 ed.). Ростов-на-Дону: Южный издательский дом. pp. 1–760. ISBN 978-5-98864-060-8.
- Воронов, Н. И.; Кавказский отдел Императорского русского географического общества (1869). "Список горских аулов Кубанской и Терской областей" [List of mountain villages of the Kuban and Terek Oblasts]. Сборник статистических сведений о Кавказе [Collection of statistical information about the Caucasus] (in Russian). Тифлис: Типографія Главнаго управленіи намѣстника Кавказскаго; типогрфія Меликова и К. pp. 41–52 (418–429 as PDF).
- Зейдлиц, Н. (1878). Терская область. Списокъ населенныхъ мѣстъ по свѣдѣніямъ 1874 года [Terek region. List of populated places according to 1874]. Списки населенныхъ мѣстъ Кавказскаго края (in Russian) (1st ed.). Тифлисъ: Типографія Главнаго управленіи намѣстника Кавказскаго. pp. 1–81.
- Терскій Областной Статистическій Комитет (1885). Благовѣщенскій, Н. А. (ed.). Списокъ населенныхъ мѣстъ Терской области: По свѣдѣніям къ 1-му января 1883 года [List of populated areas of the Terek region: According to information on January 1st of 1883] (in Russian). Владикавказъ: Типографія Терскаго Областнаго Правленія. pp. 1–78.
- Терскій Областной Статистическій Комитет (1890). Максимов, Е. (ed.). Сунженскій отдѣл [Sunzhensky Otdel]. Статистическиія таблицы населенныхъ мѣстъ Терской области (in Russian). Vol. 1. Issue 1. Владикавказъ: Типографія Терскаго Областнаго Правленія. pp. 1–85.
- Терскій Областной Статистическій Комитет (1915). Гортинскій, С. П. (ed.). Списокъ населенныхъ мѣстъ Терской области: (По даннымъ къ 1-му іюля 1914 года) [List of populated places in the Terek region: (as of July 1, 1914)] (in Russian). Владикавказъ: Электропечатня Типографія Терскаго Областнаго Правленія. pp. 2, 15–459.
- РСФСР, Сев.-Кавк. краевое стат. упр., ed. (1925). Список населённых мест Северо-Кавказского края [List of populated places in the North Caucasus region] (in Russian). Ростов-на-Дону. pp. 1–646.
- Ингуш. обл. стат. отд., ed. (1927). Список населённых мест Ингушской автономной области (по материалам Всесоюзной переписи 1926 г.) [List of populated places in the Ingush Autonomous Region (based on the materials of the All-Union Census of 1926)] (in Russian). Владикавказ: Гостипография Ингушетии. pp. 1–14.
- Albogachieva, Makka (1998). Многоликая Ингушетия [The many faces of Ingushetia] (in Russian). Saint Petersburg: «АЙЮ». pp. 1–310.
