= Akqi County =

Akqi County: 阿合奇县 (Chinese); ئاقچى ناھىيىسى (Uyghur); اقچىي وودانى (Kyrgyz); Akche, Aheqi
- County
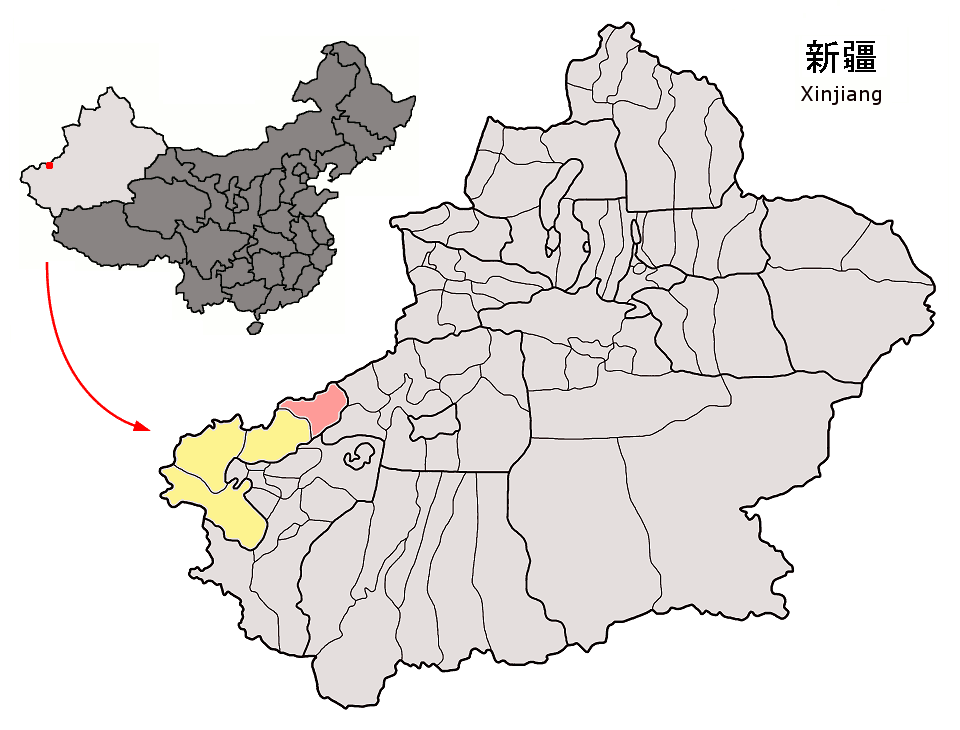
- Location of the county (red) within Kizilsu Prefecture (yellow) and Xinjiang

- Location of the seat in Xinjiang Akqi County (Xinjiang) Akqi County (China)
- Coordinates (Akqi County government): 40°56′13″N 78°26′47″E
- Country: China
- Autonomous region: Xinjiang
- Autonomous prefecture: Kizilsu
- County seat: Akqi Town

Area
  - Total: 11,545 km^{2} (4,458 sq mi)

Population (2020)
  - Total: 44,369
  - Density: 3.8431/km^{2} (9.9537/sq mi)
- Time zone: UTC+8 (China Standard Time (Note: Locals in Xinjiang frequently observe UTC+6 (Xinjiang Time), 2 hours behind Beijing.))
- Postal code: 843500
- Area code: 653023
- Website: www.xjahq.gov.cn

Akqi County

Chinese name
- Simplified Chinese: 阿合奇县
- Traditional Chinese: 阿合奇縣
Transcriptions
Standard Mandarin
- Hanyu Pinyin: Āhéqí Xiàn

Uyghur name
- Uyghur: ئاقچى ناھىيىسى
Transcriptions
- Latin Yëziqi: Aqchi Nahiyisi
- Yengi Yeziⱪ: Aⱪqi Naⱨiyisi
- SASM/GNC: Akqi Nahiyisi
- Siril Yëziqi: Ақчи Наһийиси

Kyrgyz name
- Kyrgyz: اقچئي وودانى; Акчий ооданы Aqçiy oodanı

Akqi County (Chinese: 阿合奇县; Uyghur: ئاقچى ناھىيىسى; Kyrgyz: اقچئي وودانى) is a county in Xinjiang Uygur Autonomous Region, China. It is under the administration of the Kizilsu Kyrgyz Autonomous Prefecture. The county has a town and five townships, six communities and 25 villages under its jurisdiction in 2018, its county seat is Akqi Town. The county has a population of about 46,000 (as of 2018) with main ethnic groups of Kyrgyz, Han and Uyghur peoples.

The name of Akqi was from the Kyrgyz language, meaning white achnatherum calamagrostis (白芨芨草). The Administrative Division of Akqi (阿合奇设治局) was first established, it was named after its seat located in the Village of Akqi (阿合奇村). The county of Akqi is located in alpine areas of the southern hinterland in Western Tianshan. Its altitude is between 1,730–5,958 m (5,676–19,547 ft), with a terrain characteristics of the "two mountains and one valley", its whole territory is in a mountain valley area, of which, highland accounts for 90 percent, farmland for five percent and water body for five percent.

The county covers an area of about 11,545 km^{2} (4,458 sq mi), it borders with Wushi County in the east, Keping County in the southeast, Bachu County and Atushi City in the south-west, the northern and western part of the county is adjacent to the Kyrgyz Republic with a border line of 305.3 km (189.7 mi). The county seat is 1,180 km (730 mi) away from the regional capital Ürümqi by road.

== History ==
The county of Akqi was part of the territory of Weitou State (尉头国), one of 36 States of the Western Regions (西域三十六国), and part of Protectorate of the Western Regions (59 BC) in the Han period. It was part of Weitou Prefecture (尉头州) in Kucha Commandery (龟兹都督府) in the Tang period, and part of Wushi County in the Qing period.

The Administrative Division of Akqi (阿合奇设治局) was first established from part of Wushi County in 1940, it was named after its seat located in the Village of Akqi (阿合奇村) in the present Karaqi Township (哈拉奇乡). In 1941, its seat was moved to Uq (吾曲), the present-day county seat of Akqi Town (阿合奇镇). The Administrative Division of Akqi was upgraded to be as a county in 1944. The county was under the administration of Aksu Prefecture in 1950, as a county, it was amalgamated to the newly formed Kyrgyz autonomous prefecture of Kizilsu in 1954.

== Geography and climate ==
The county of Akqi is high in the north and south, low in the middle, and tilted from west to east. Forming land features of terrain with two mountains and a valley, in the north, the Kuokexiale Mountain (阔克夏勒山) is a southern branch of Tianshan, with a maximum altitude of 5,958 m (19,547 ft). To the south is Galatieke Mountain (喀拉铁克山), with its maximum altitude of 4,981 m (16,342 ft). Between the two mountains is the Taushgan Valley (托什干河谷), from west to east through the middle of the county, 3,200–1,750 m (10,500–5,740 ft) above sea level. Agricultural oasis is mainly concentrated in the valley area, the mountain natural pastoral land accounts for 86% of the county area. The Taushgan River (托什干河) originates from the Kyrgyz Republic and has 19 tributaries, such as the Uzuntux River (乌宗图什河), with a total runoff of 2.421 billion cubic metres in the county. The annual average temperature is 6.5 °C (43.7 °F), the average temperature in January is −10 °C (14 °F), and the average temperature in July is 18.8 °C (65.8 °F). The average annual precipitation is 209.9 mm (8.26 in), with a frost-free period of 156 days.

Climate data for Akqi, elevation 1,985 m (6,512 ft), (1991–2020 normals, extremes 1991–present)
Month	Jan	Feb	Mar	Apr	May	Jun	Jul	Aug	Sep	Oct	Nov	Dec	Year
Record high °C (°F)	13.0 (55.4)	16.6 (61.9)	24.2 (75.6)	28.3 (82.9)	30.4 (86.7)	34.6 (94.3)	35.2 (95.4)	34.4 (93.9)	30.4 (86.7)	27.9 (82.2)	19.8 (67.6)	14.7 (58.5)	35.2 (95.4)
Mean daily maximum °C (°F)	−2.4 (27.7)	1.0 (33.8)	9.1 (48.4)	16.9 (62.4)	21.2 (70.2)	24.6 (76.3)	26.7 (80.1)	25.5 (77.9)	21.3 (70.3)	14.6 (58.3)	6.4 (43.5)	−0.1 (31.8)	13.7 (56.7)
Daily mean °C (°F)	−9.0 (15.8)	−5.0 (23.0)	3.0 (37.4)	10.3 (50.5)	14.4 (57.9)	17.6 (63.7)	19.4 (66.9)	18.3 (64.9)	14.2 (57.6)	7.7 (45.9)	0.1 (32.2)	−6.7 (19.9)	7.0 (44.6)
Mean daily minimum °C (°F)	−13.9 (7.0)	−10.2 (13.6)	−2.3 (27.9)	4.5 (40.1)	8.6 (47.5)	11.9 (53.4)	13.5 (56.3)	12.7 (54.9)	8.6 (47.5)	2.4 (36.3)	−4.4 (24.1)	−11.2 (11.8)	1.7 (35.0)
Record low °C (°F)	−28.8 (−19.8)	−24.7 (−12.5)	−17.3 (0.9)	−7.2 (19.0)	−0.8 (30.6)	1.9 (35.4)	7.7 (45.9)	3.6 (38.5)	0.4 (32.7)	−6.7 (19.9)	−17.7 (0.1)	−22.6 (−8.7)	−28.8 (−19.8)
Average precipitation mm (inches)	2.0 (0.08)	6.0 (0.24)	10.1 (0.40)	19.2 (0.76)	34.9 (1.37)	34.5 (1.36)	50.2 (1.98)	57.3 (2.26)	43.2 (1.70)	8.8 (0.35)	2.5 (0.10)	2.0 (0.08)	270.7 (10.68)
Average precipitation days (≥ 0.1 mm)	2.4	3.4	3.7	4.4	8.3	10.6	12.6	13.1	8.3	3.0	1.8	2.0	73.6
Average snowy days	6.3	5.9	5.2	1.7	0.3	0	0	0	0.1	0.8	3.1	6.1	29.5
Average relative humidity (%)	60	58	49	42	45	47	50	54	54	52	57	60	52
Mean monthly sunshine hours	190.3	192.7	219.2	235.6	261.9	262.9	280.5	261.9	241.9	241.1	200.2	181.7	2,769.9
Percentage possible sunshine	63	63	58	58	58	58	62	63	66	72	69	64	63
Source: China Meteorological Administration all-time January high

== Population and ethnic groups ==
As of 2015, There was a population of 44,656 in Akqi County, accounting for 7.49% of Kizilsu Autonomous Prefecture's population. Of that, minority population of 40,121, accounting for 89.84%, and Han population of 4,535, accounting for 10.16%. The main minorities are Kyrgyz and Uyghur in the county. The Kyrgyz population was 38,765, accounting for 86.81%, and Uyghurs of 1,193, accounting for 2.67%. There were Hui people of 80, Kazakhs of 39 and others of 44.

The proportion of nationalities in Akqi County, 2018
Nationality	Percentage
Kyrgyz	76.1%
Uyghurs	12.8%
Han People	10.5%
Hui People	0.2%
Kazakhs	0.1%
Tajiks	0.1%
Others	0.2%
Source of the population statistics :

== Administrative divisions ==
The county was divided into a town and five townships.

Name	Simplified Chinese	Hanyu Pinyin	Uyghur (UEY)	Uyghur Latin (ULY)	Kyrgyz (Arabic script)	Kyrgyz (Cyrillic script)	Kyrgyz (Romanisation)	Administrative division code	Number of communities	Number of villages
Towns
Akqi Town	阿合奇镇	Āhéqí Zhèn	ئاقچى بازىرى	Aqchi Atush baziri	اقچئي شاارچاسى	Ак-Чий шаарчасы	Ak-Chiy saarchasy	653023100	5	3
Townships
Kulansarak Township	库兰萨日克乡	Kùlánsàrìkè Xiāng	قۇلانساراق يېزىسى	qulansaraq yëzisi	قۇلانساراق ايىلى	Кулансарак айылы	Kulansarak ayyly	653023200	0	5
Saparbay Township	色帕巴依乡	Sèpàbāyī Xiāng	ساپارباي يېزىسى	saparbay yëzisi	ساپارباي ايىلى	Сапарбай айылы	Saparbay ayyly	653023201	0	3
Somtax Township	苏木塔什乡	Sūmùtǎshí Xiāng	سومتاش يېزىسى	somtash yëzisi	سومتاش ايىلى	Сом-Таш айылы	Som-Tash ayyly	653023202	0	4
Karaqi Township	哈拉奇乡	Hālāqí Xiāng	قاراچى يېزىسى	qarachi yëzisi	قاراچئي ايىلى	Карачий айылы	Karachiy ayyly	653023203	1	3
Karabulak Township	哈拉布拉克乡	Hālābùlākè Xiāng	قارابۇلاق يېزىسى	qarabulaq yëzisi	قارابۇلاق ايىلى	Кара-Булак айылы	Kara-Bulak ayyly	653023204	0	7

== Tourism ==
- Kyrgyz Non-material Cultural Town of Akqi County: Located in the western section of Jolangqi New Town (佳朗奇新城), the Kyrgyz Non-material Cultural Town (柯尔克孜非遗小镇) is a Kyrgyz folk culture village with an area of 1.5 sq kilomiters, it is a destination for Kyrgyz folk culture, consisting of Manas culture, falcon culture, nomadism, kumz string instrument, Kyrgyz felt show and embroider. It is seven kilometers away from the old town of Akqi.
