= Tsorins =

Ingush society

Цхьорой
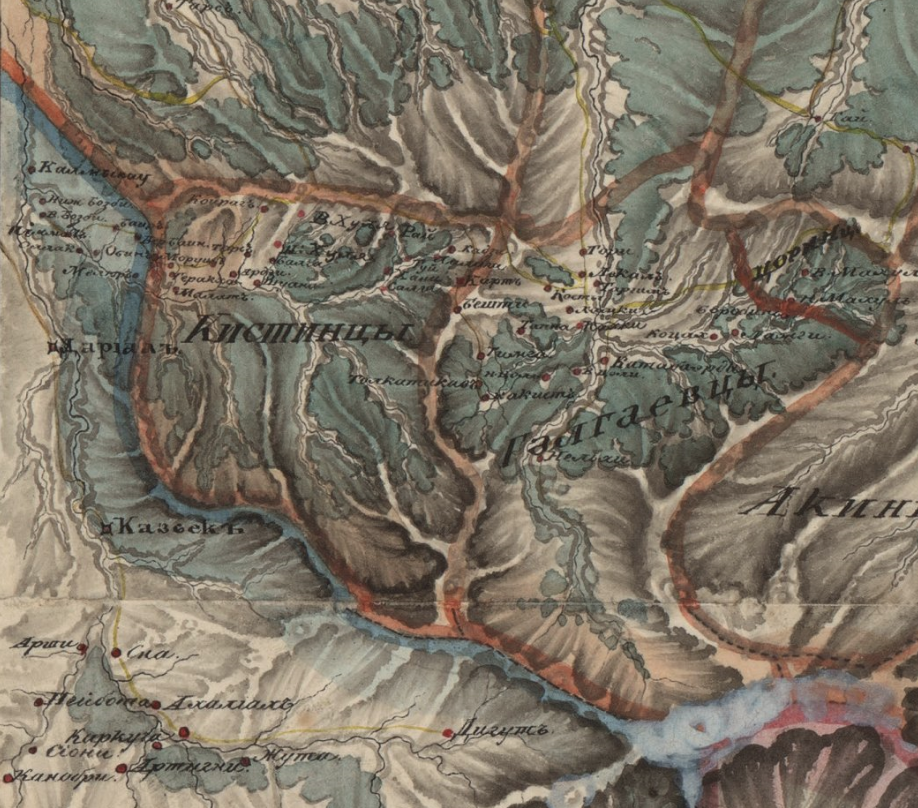
- Tsorins (Цоринцы) on the map of the Caucasus region.

Total population
- 774 (1851)

Regions with significant populations
- Ingushetia

Languages
- Ingush

Religion
- Sunni Islam

Tsorins, Tsori (Ingush: Цхьорой), also Ghalghaï (Ingush: ГIалгIай), were a historical Ingush ethnoterritorial society (Note: Tsorins were mentioned as an Ingush society by "Overview of the political state of the Caucasus in 1840", "Caucasian Territory // Military Statistical Review of the Russian Empire, 1851", Ivanov, Volkonsky, Maksimov and Vertepov, Pantyukhov, Martirosian, Soviet Ethnography, Krupnov, Volkova, Dagestani branch of the Academy of Sciences of the Soviet Union, G. Anchabadze, Indiana University V. A. Kuznetsov and Pavlova.) that was located in mountainous Ingushetia in the region of river Guloykhi. The center of the society was Tsori from which it got its name. Tsorin society, like the Khamkhin society, was formed from the former "Galgai society" as a result of the transfer (appearance) of rural government to the village Tsori.

== Etymology ==
According to Suleymanov, the word "Tshoroy" may originate from the word Tshar (Ingush: Цхьар). Tshar is mail mesh helmet that covers the face and neck of a warrior.

== History ==
Tsorin society, like the Khamkhin society, was formed from the former "Galgai society" as a result of the transfer (appearance) of rural government to the village Tsori.

In 1832, due to the collaboration of Ingush with Kazi-Mulla and the murder of a bailiff, Rozen led a punitive expedition on Ingush and went through Dzheyrakh and Metskhal around Khamkhi and Tsori. During the Caucasian War, Tsorins (as well as other Ingush societies) were considered half-conquered by the Russian Empire. This was witnessed by Russian cavalry colonel and military-historian of German background, A. L. Zisserman, who in 1848 went through Tsori and reported that he had to stealthily pass it and follow precautions. After the end of Caucasian war, Tsorins were part of Ingushskiy Okrug.

In 1883, Tsorin society consisted completely of Ghalghaï (Ingush).

== Composition ==
Tsorin society consisted of following settlements:

- Tsori
- Agutyr
- Arshaug
- Besht
- Biyre
- Gorshke
- Gul
- Kashete
- Koyrakh
- Lyazhg
- Oaseg
- Vitsy
- Gvezi

== Bibliography ==
- Терскій Областной Статистическій Комитет (1885). Благовѣщенскій, Н. А. (ed.). Списокъ населенныхъ мѣстъ Терской области: По свѣдѣніям къ 1-му января 1883 года [List of populated areas of the Terek region: According to information on January 1st of 1883] (in Russian). Владикавказъ: Типографія Терскаго Областнаго Правленія. pp. 1–78.
- Максимов, Е.; Вертепов, Г. (1892). Туземцы Северного Кавказа. Историко-статистические очерки. Выпуск первый. Осетины, ингуши, кабардинцы [Natives of the North Caucasus. Historical and statistical essays. Release the first. Ossetians, Ingush, Kabardians] (in Russian). Владикавказ: Типография Областного правления Терской Области. pp. 1–189.
- Волкова, Н. Г. (1973). Лавров, Л. И. (ed.). Этнонимы и племенные названия Северного Кавказа [Ethnonyms and tribal names of the North Caucasus] (in Russian). Москва: Наука. pp. 1–210.
- Сулейманов, А. С. (1978). Шайхиев, А. Х. (ed.). Топонимия Чечено-Ингушетии [Toponymy of Checheno-Ingushetia] (in Russian). Vol. 2: Горная Ингушетия (юго-запад) и Чечня (центр и юго-восток). Грозный: Чечено-Ингушское Книжное Издательство. pp. 1–233.
- Мальсагов, З. К. (1963). Оздоева, Ф. (ed.). Грамматика ингушского языка [Grammar of the Ingush language] (in Ingush and Russian). Vol. 5 (2nd ed.). Грозный: Чечено-Ингушское Книжное Издательство. pp. 1–164.
- Зязиков, М. М. (2004). Традиционная культура ингушей: история и современность [Traditional culture of the Ingush: history and modernity] (in Russian). Ростов-на-Дону: СКНЦ ВШ. pp. 1–312. ISBN 5-87872-302-6.
- Куркиев, А. С. (2005). Мургустов, М. С.; Ахриева, М. С.; Гагиев, К. А.; Куркиева, С. Х.; Султыгова, З. Н. (eds.). Ингушско-русский словарь: 11142 слова [Ingush-Russian dictionary: 11142 words] (in Russian). Магас: Сердало. pp. 1–545. ISBN 5-94452-054-X.
- "Кавказский край" [Caucasian territory]. Военно-статистическое обозрение Российской империи: издаваемое по высочайшему повелению при 1-м отделении Департамента Генерального штаба [Military Statistical Review of the Russian Empire: published by the highest command at the 1st branch of the Department of the General Staff] (in Russian). Vol. 16. Part 1. СПб.: Типография Департамента Генерального штаба. 1851. pp. 1–274.
- Волконский, Н. А. (1886). "Война на Восточном Кавказе с 1824 по 1834 годы в связи с мюридизмом" [War in the Eastern Caucasus from 1824 to 1834 in connection with Muridism]. Кавказский сборник [Caucasian collection] (in Russian). Vol. 10. Тифлис. pp. 1–225.
- Пантюхов, И. И. (1901). Ингуши. Антропологический очерк [Ingush. An anthropological essay] (in Russian). Тифлис: Типография К. П. Козловского. Головинский пр.. д. № 12. pp. 1–35.
- Мартиросиан, Г. К. (1928). Нагорная Ингушия [Upland Ingushiya] (in Russian). Владикавказ: Государственная типография Автономной Области Ингушии. pp. 1–153.
- Крупнов, Е. И. (1971). Средневековая Ингушетия [Medieval Ingushetia] (in Russian). Москва: Наука. pp. 1–211.
- Anchabadze, George (2001). Vainakhs (The Chechen and Ingush). Tbilisi: Caucasian House. pp. 1–76.
- Кузнецов, В. А. (2004). Введение в кавказоведение (историко-этнологические очерки народов Северного Кавказа) [Introduction to Caucasian Studies (Historical and Ethnological Essays on the Peoples of the North Caucasus)] (in Russian). Владикавказ: ИПП им. В. А. Гассиева. pp. 1–184.
- Павлова, О. С. (2012). Ингушский этнос на современном этапе: черты социально-психологического портрета [The Ingush ethnos at the present stage: features of the socio-psychological portrait] (in Russian). Москва: Форум. pp. 1–384. ISBN 9785911346652. OCLC 798995782.
- Генко, А. Н. (1930). "Из культурного прошлого ингушей" [From the cultural past of the Ingush]. Записки коллегии востоковедов при Азиатском музее [Notes of the College of Orientalists at the Asian Museum] (in Russian). Vol. 5. Ленинград: Издательство Академии наук СССР. pp. 681–761.
- Parova, L. M. (2005). "Кисты" [Kists]. In Y. A. Zhdanov (ed.). Энциклопедия культур народов Юга России [Encyclopedia of cultures of the peoples of the South of Russia]. Vol. I. Rostov-on-Don: СКНЦ ВШ. p. 71. ISBN 5-87872-089-2.
- Зиссерман, А. Л. (1879). Двадцать пять лет на Кавказе (1842-1867) [Twenty-five years in the Caucasus (1842-1867)] (in Russian). Vol. 1: 1842-1851. Санкт-Петербург: Типографія А. С. Суворина. pp. 1–432.
- Воронов, Н. И.; Кавказский отдел Императорского русского географического общества (1869). "Списокъ горскихъ ауловъ Кубанской и Терской областей" [List of mountain villages of the Kuban and Terek Oblasts]. Сборникъ статистическихъ свѣдѣній о Кавказѣ [Collection of statistical information about the Caucasus] (in Russian). Vol. 1. Тифлисъ: Типографія Главного Управления Намѣстника Кавказского, типографія Меликова и К. pp. 41–52 (418–429 as PDF).
- Картоев, М. М. (2020). Ингушетия в политике Российской империи на Кавказе. XIX век. Сборник документов и материалов (in Russian) (2 ed.). Ростов-на-Дону: Южный издательский дом. pp. 1–760. ISBN 978-5-98864-060-8.
