= Dizəvər =

- Location within Azerbaijan
- Coordinates: 40°49′48″N 49°09′40″E
- Country: Azerbaijan
- Rayon: Khizi
- Municipality: Qarabulaq
- Time zone: UTC+4 (AZT)
  - Summer (DST): UTC+5 (AZT)

Dizəvər (also Dizavar) is a village in the Khizi Rayon of Azerbaijan. The village forms part of the municipality of Qarabulaq.
