= Zəhmətkənd =

Zahmetkend
- Municipality
- Azerbaijani: Zəhmətkənt
- Location within Azerbaijan
- Coordinates: 40°41′02″N 45°49′51″E
- Country: Azerbaijan
- District: Gadabay

Population
  - Total: 1,954
- Time zone: UTC+4 (AZT)
  - Summer (DST): UTC+5 (AZT)

Zəhmətkənd (also, Zahmetkend) is a village and municipality in the Gadabay District of Azerbaijan. It has a population of 1,954. The municipality consists of the villages of Zahmetkend and Garabulag.
