= Karabulak, Astrakhan Oblast =

Karabulak Карабулак
- Settlement
- Location within Astrakhan Oblast Location within Russia
- Coordinates: 46°03′N 47°34′E
- Country: Russia
- Region: Astrakhan Oblast
- District: Ikryaninsky District
- Time zone: UTC+4:00

Karabulak (Russian: Карабулак) is a rural locality (a settlement) in Ikryaninsky Selsoviet, Ikryaninsky District, Astrakhan Oblast, Russia. The population was 275 as of 2010. There are 3 streets.

== Geography ==
Karabulak is located 18 km west of Ikryanoye (the district's administrative centre) by road. Sergino is the nearest rural locality.
