= Karabulak, Sayram District =

Village in the Sayram District, South Kazakhstan Region

Karabulak Qorabuloq
- Location in Kazakhstan
- Coordinates: 42°31′0″N 69°48′0″E
- Country: Kazakhstan
- Region: South Kazakhstan Region

Government
  - Akim (mayor): Zakirzhan Ibragimov

Population (2015 census)
  - City: 53 573; Uzbeks - 99%
  - Metro: Shymkent
- Time zone: UTC+6 (BTT)
- Postal code: 160804
- Area code: +7 72531

The village of Karabulak (Kazakh: Қарабұлақ; Uzbek: Қорабулок, Russian: Карабулак) — is one of the largest villages of Sayram District, South Kazakhstan Region. The population is more than 53 thousand (as of 2015). The area is 11,134 hectares. It is located 45 km from Shymkent, the regional center, and 18 km from Aksukent village, the district center. There are 11 schools, 1 college and 3 marketplaces in the village. Also there are 19 mosques, 2 hospitals, 2 policlinics, a kindergarten, Alisher Navoiy cultural center and the largest mosque in Sayram for 10 thousand. Most of the population of the village are ethnic Uzbeks who constitute up to 99% of the villagers.

== History ==
Throughout history, Karabulak was part of states that reigned the area that more or less corresponds to present-day Uzbekistan. From 1809 until 1876, Karabulak was part of the Uzbek Khanate of Kokand. In mid-19th century, the Russian Empire began occupying the area of present-day Central Asia. By the late 19th century, imperial Russia had conquered all of the three states that dominated the territory roughly corresponding to present-day Uzbekistan. The Khanate of Khiva was conquered in 1873 and the Emirate of Bukhara fell in 1868. The Kokand Khanate formally became part of the Russian Empire in 1876.

Even though Karabulak was historically an Uzbek settlement, it became part of present-day Kazakhstan. When Russians split the Turkestan Autonomous Soviet Socialist Republic into autonomous oblasts, Karabulak became part of the Kirghiz ASSR which was later reorganized into the Kazakh SSR. After the dissolution of the USSR, the Kazakh SSR became Kazakhstan. Thus, despite being a majority-Uzbek settlement, Karabulak became part of Kazakhstan.

Some sources hold that the Soviets drew borders inconsistent with the traditional locations of ethnic populations so that people with historical claims to land would be dependent on the central power, that is Moscow, making them easier to control. According to these sources, the creation of individual republics was meant to reduce the threat of pan-Turkic or pan-Islamic movements in Central Asia. This strategy has been referred to as Joseph Stalin's "divide and rule" policy. Currently there are many traditionally Uzbek settlements in Kazakhstan. Many people in Central Asia believe that they should more appropriately be part of another country. However, some scholars claim that since during the Soviet demarcation of Central Asia many places in Central Asia were ethnically mixed, it was impossible to clearly define ethnic and territorial boundaries.

== Transport ==
The nearest railway station is at distance of 18 km in the settlement of city type of Aksukent. Karabulak is located at distance of 45 km from the regional downtown of Shymkent. Karabulaka to other settlements of the country is connected by highways. Karabulak is located at distance of 1450 km from Astana. From Karabulak to the capital it is possible to reach approximately for 21 hours.

== Famous natives ==
- Tashtemir Rustemov — Hero of the Soviet Union (posthumously).
- Usarkul haji Iriskulov — Academician, famous traditional healer. He was awarded a medal "the best healer of the Millennium", Medal of the first degree and the order of the Hippocratic "Star healer". Userkul Haji is a laureate of the "Golden Heart" charity "Bauyrzhan". The State also noted the merits he was awarded the aksakal "Parasat", and the title of "honorary citizen of sajram district of the SKr"
- Badritdin Nishankulov — President korporaciâsii "NiK". Member of the Assembly of peoples of Kazakhstan.
- Murodjon Abubakirov— Head of State-owned municipal Enterprise Edition South-Kazakhstan regional socio-political newspaper "Janubiy Qozog′iston".

== Facts ==
In April 2012, after a rise in suicides among school students, residents sacrificed a white camel on the advice of a local imam.

== Gallery ==
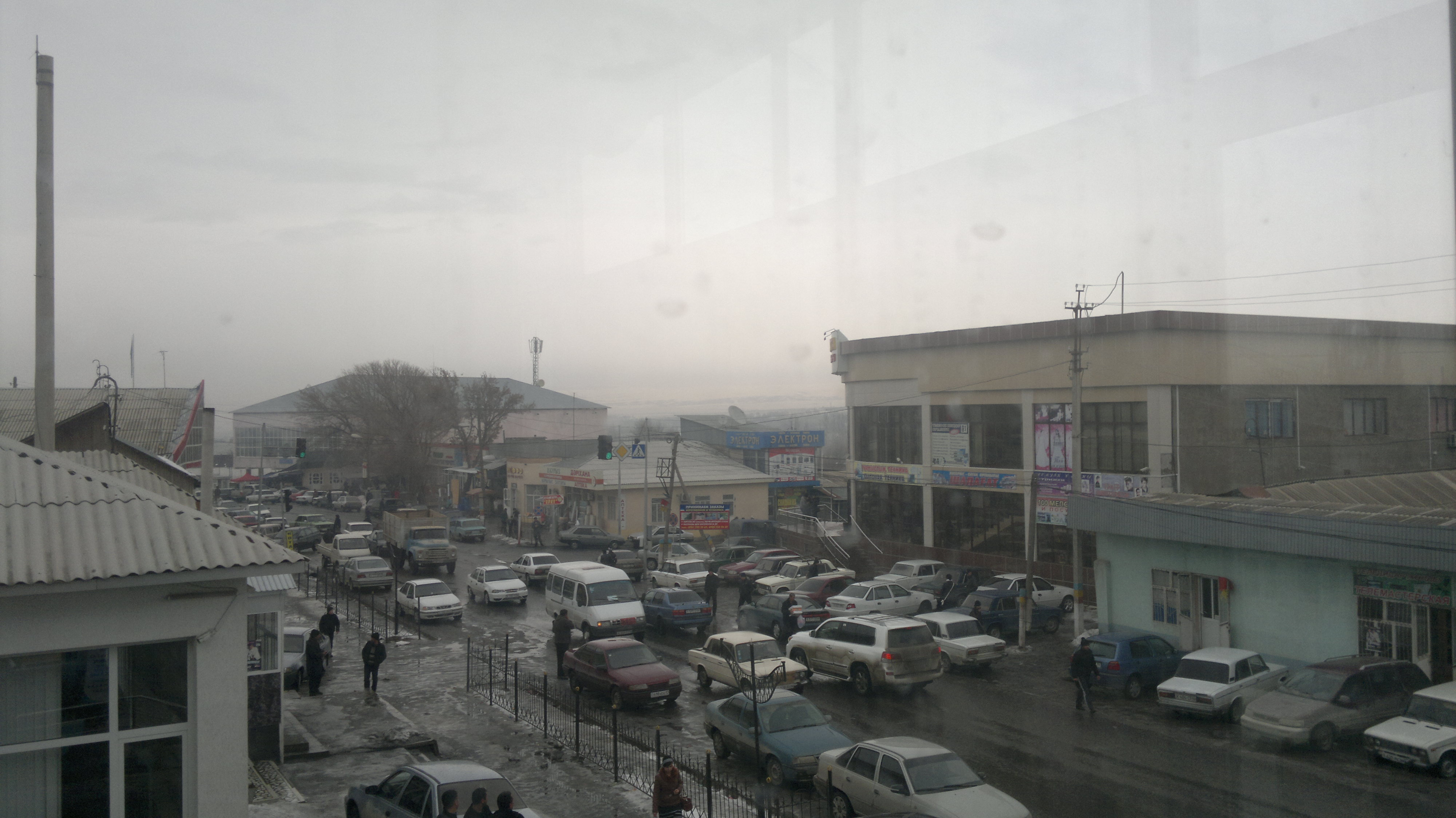

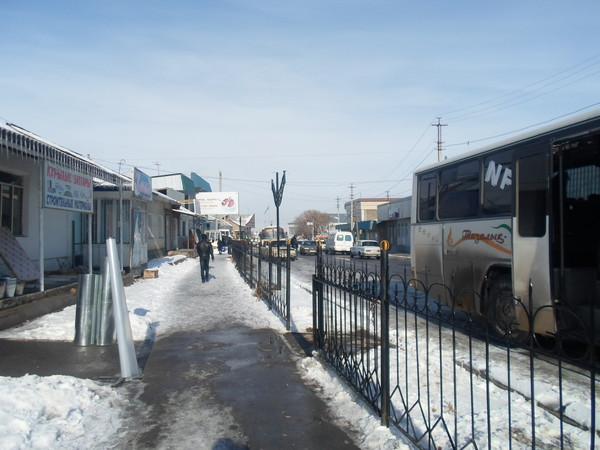

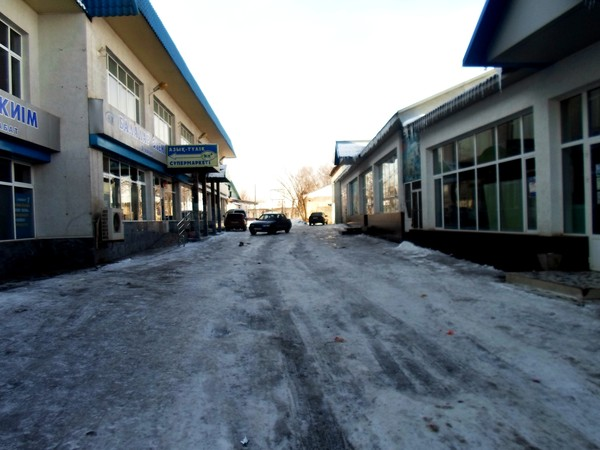

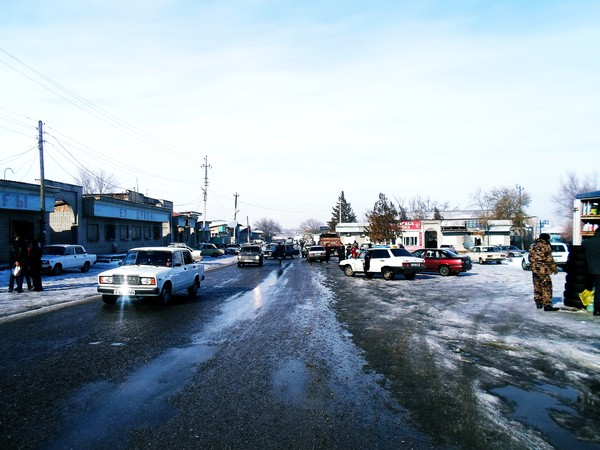

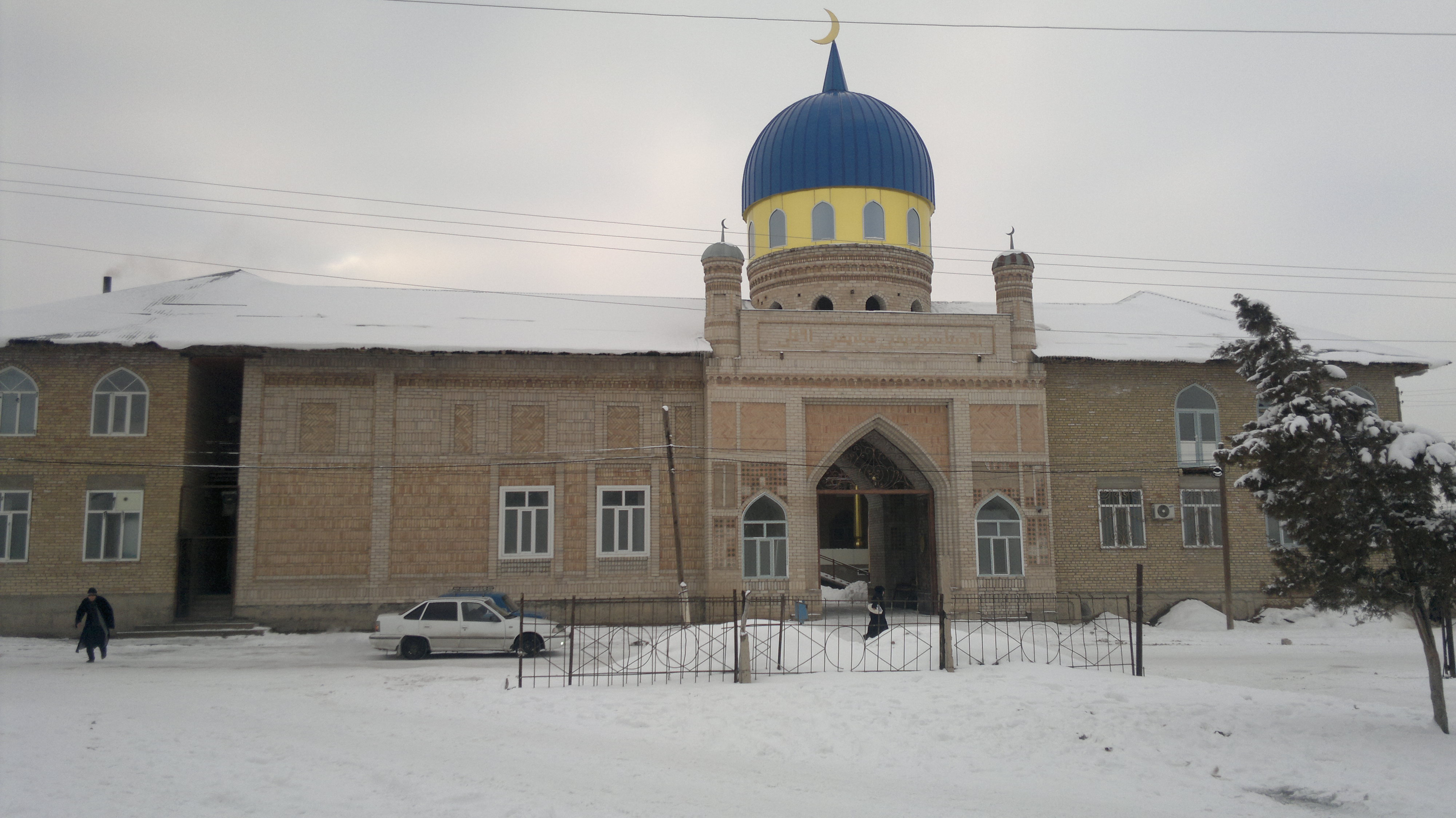

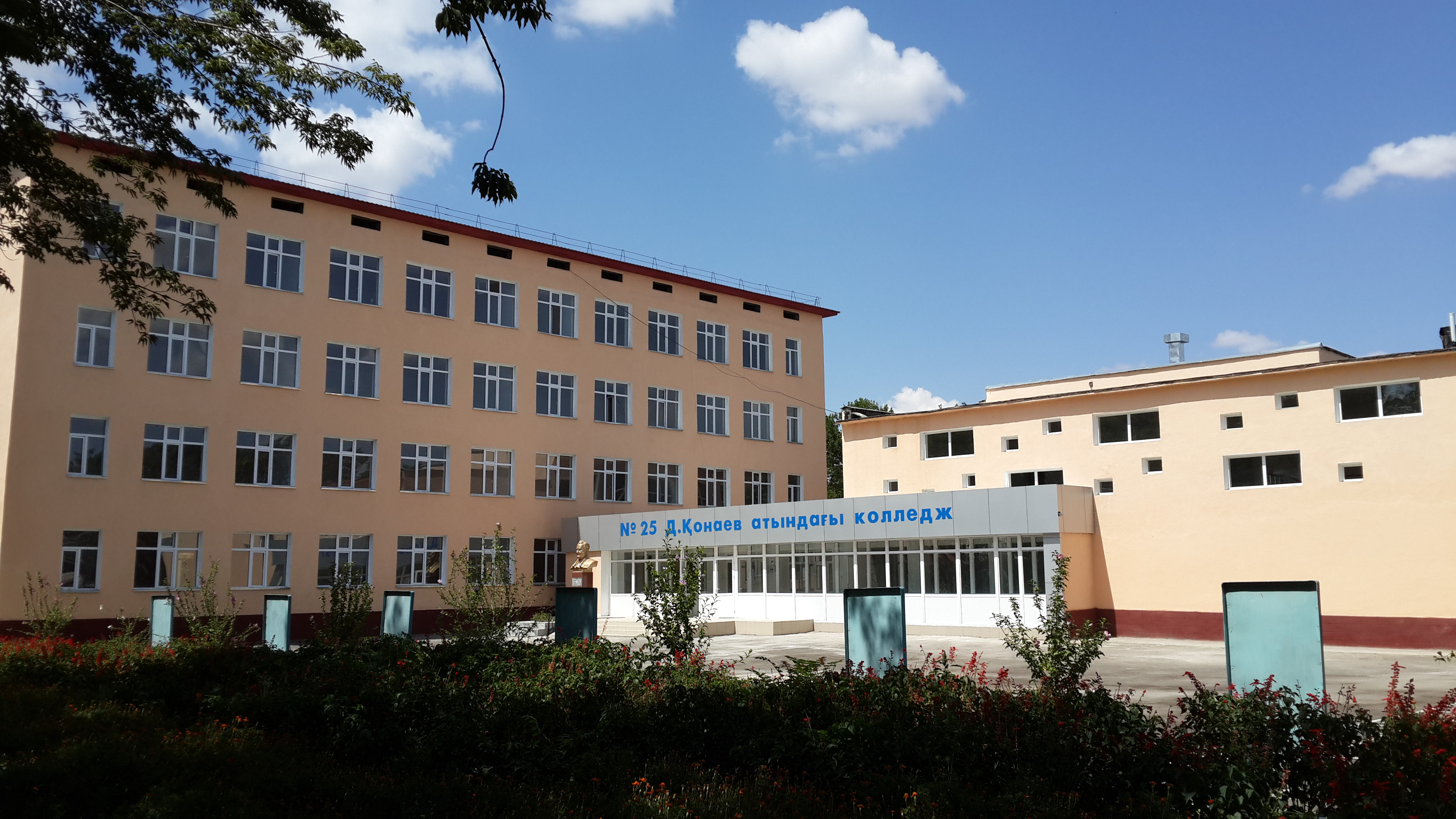

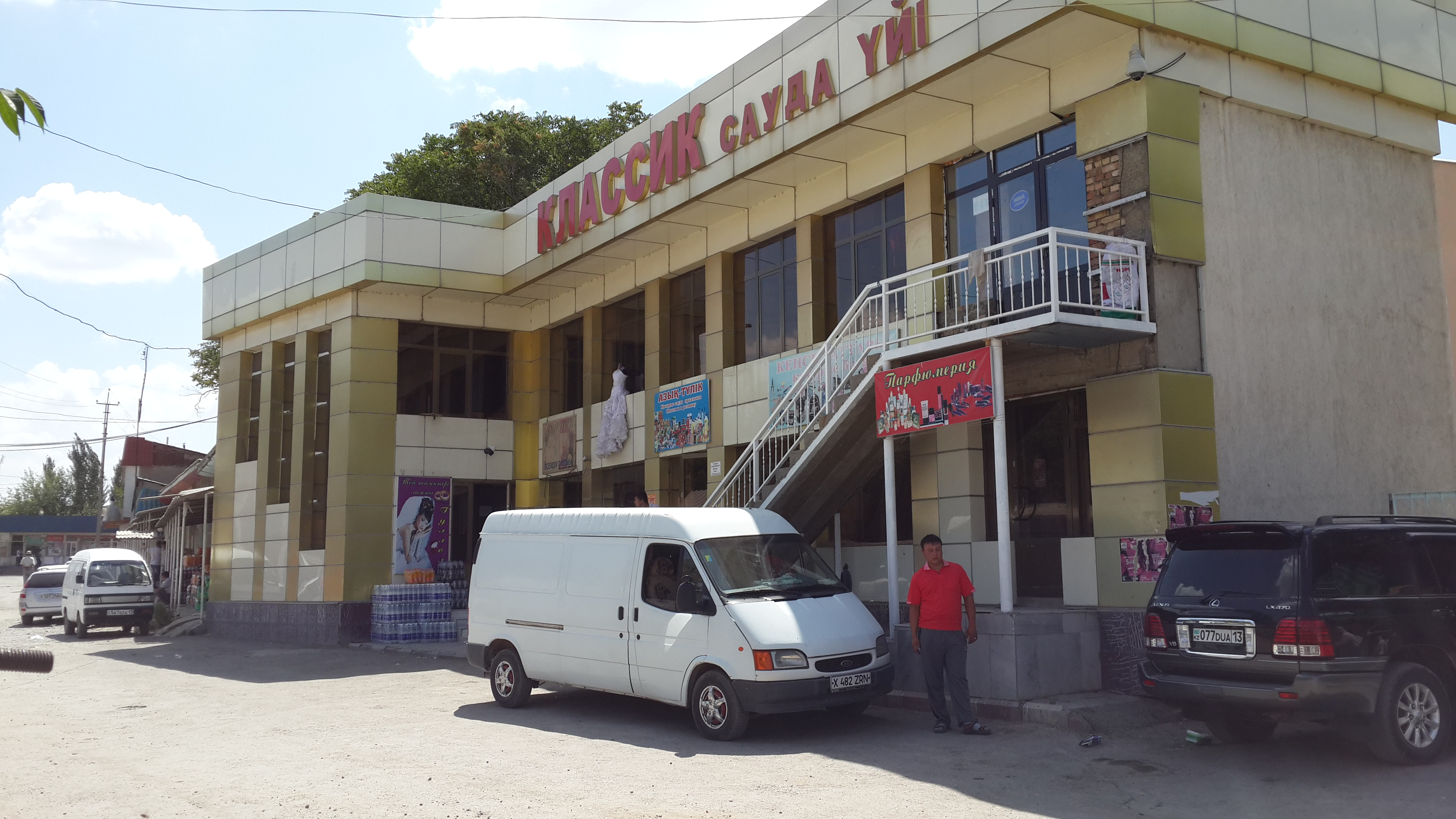

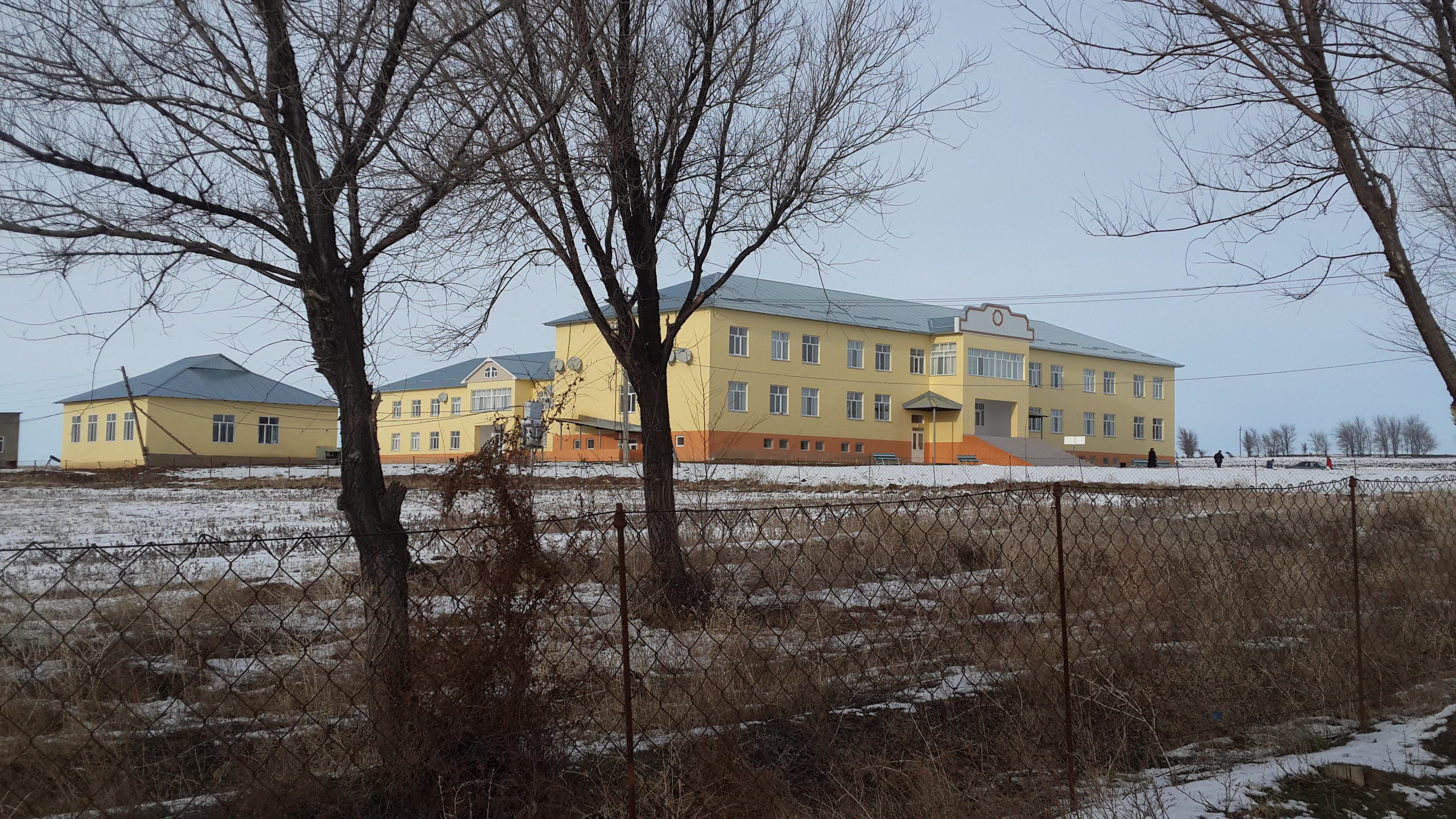

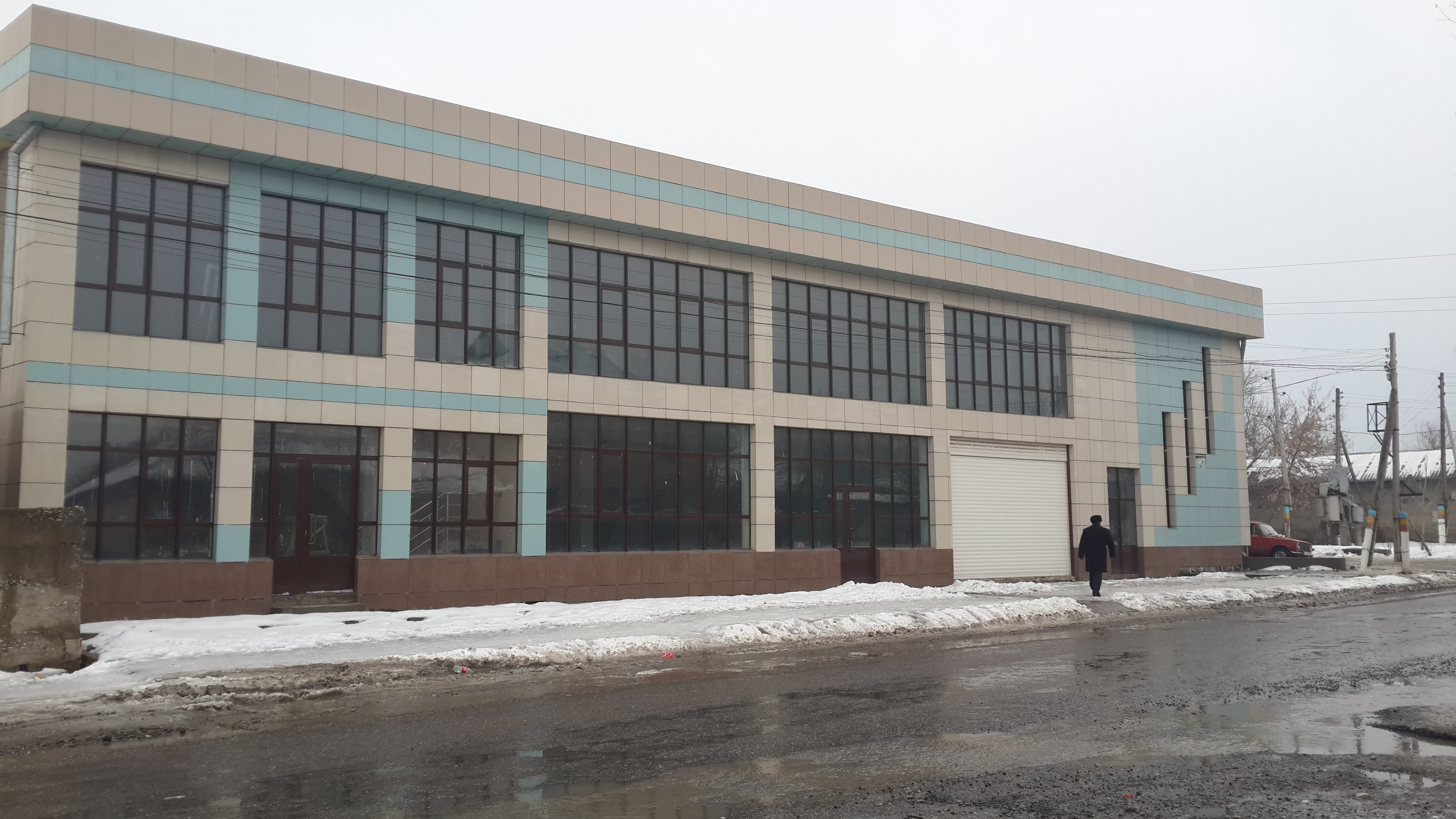

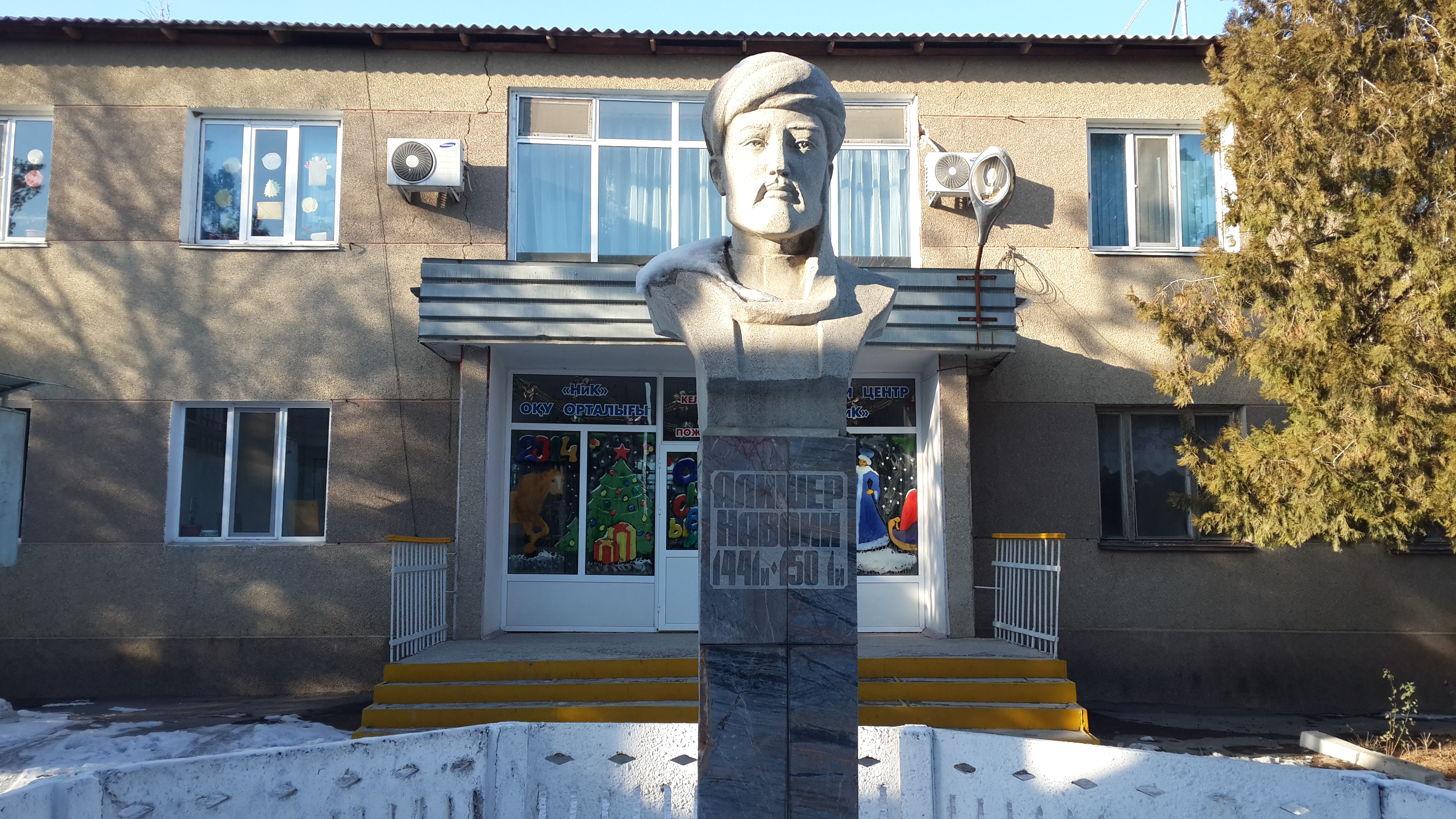

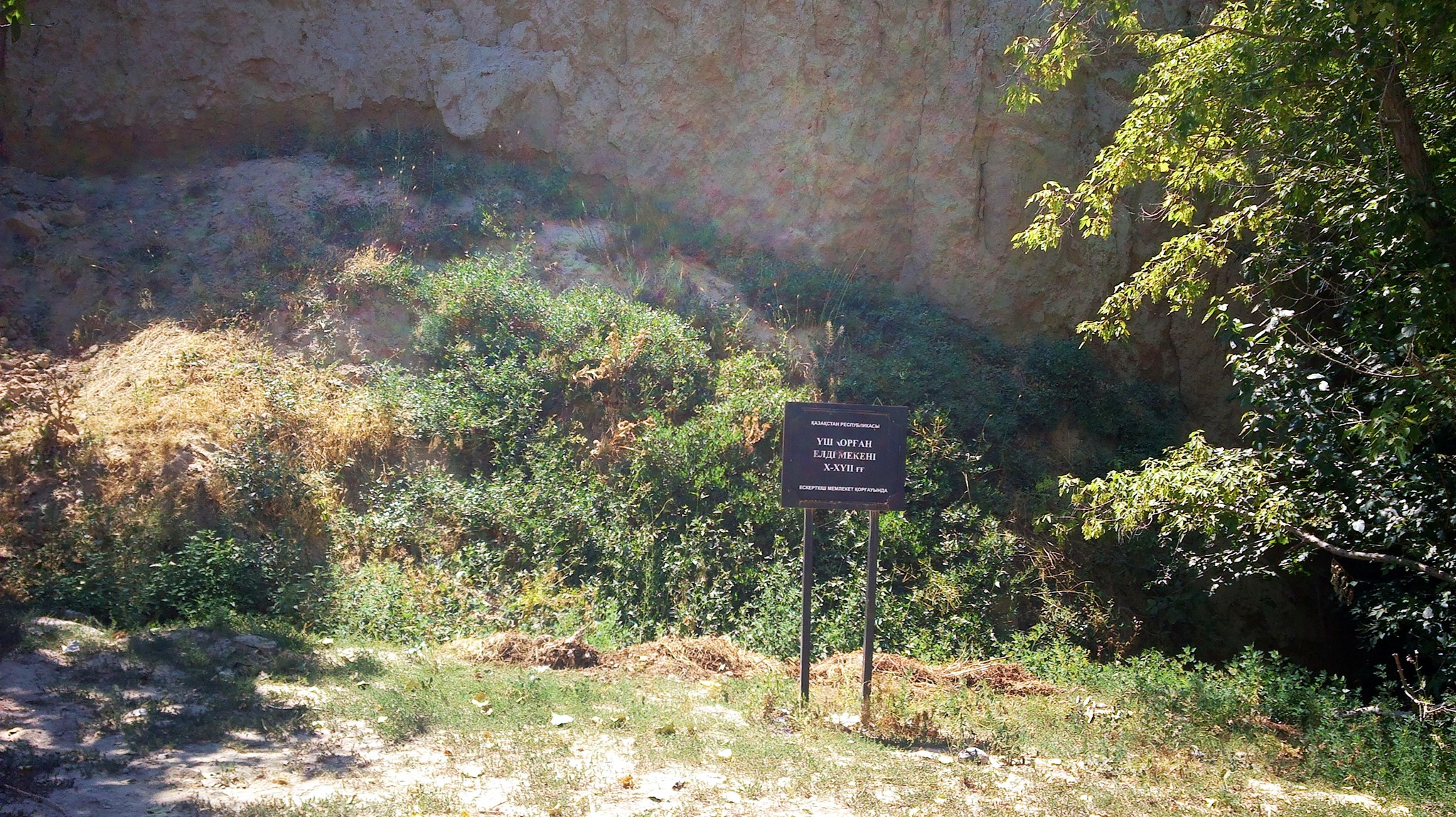
