= Eskeldi District =

Coordinates: 44°54′12″N 78°29′42″E

Eskeldi
- District
- Ескелді ауданы
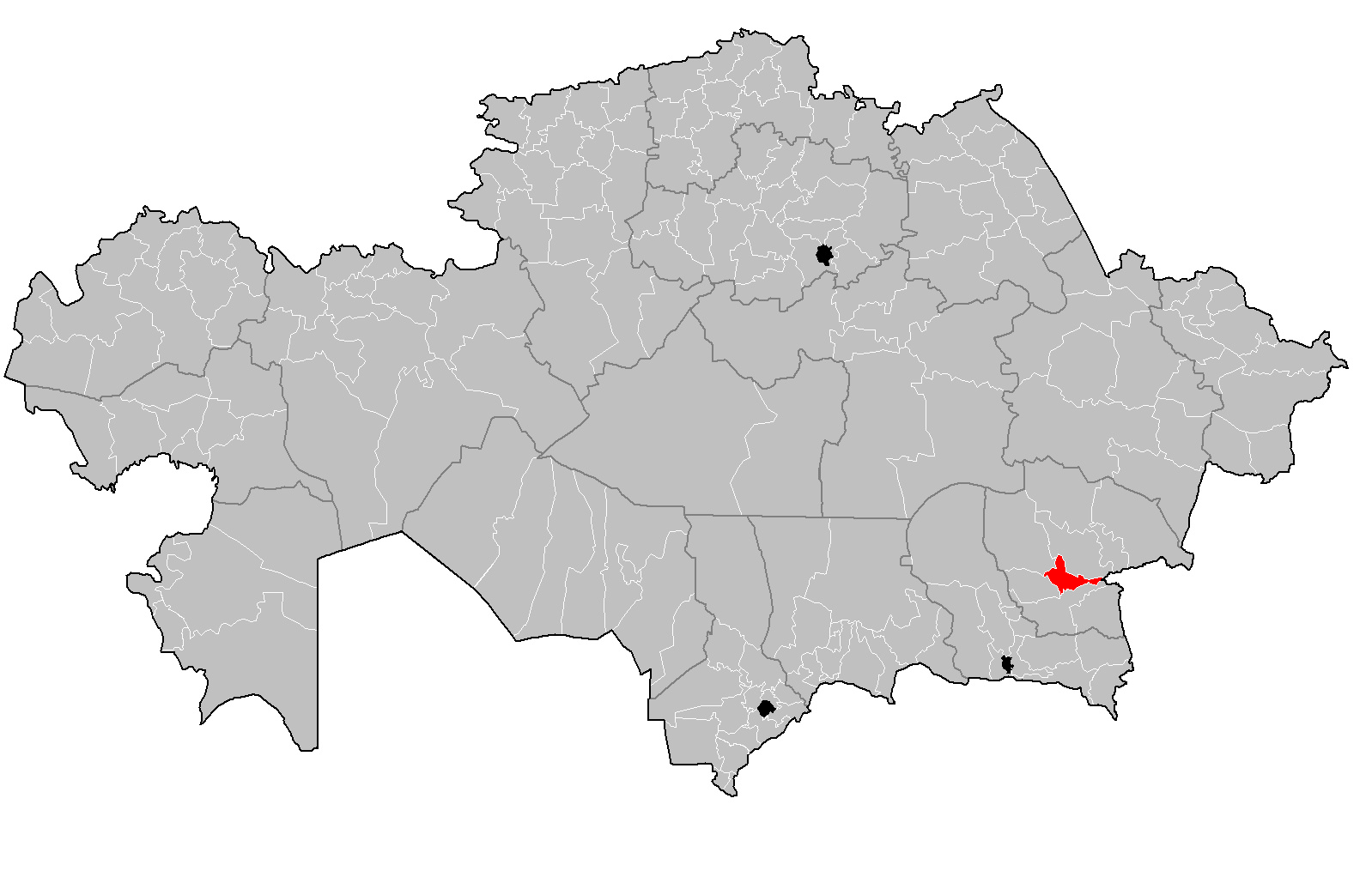
- Country: Kazakhstan
- Region: Jetisu Region
- Administrative center: Karabulak

Government
  - Akim: Akhmetov Eldos Tursynbaevich

Area
  - Total: 1,700 sq mi (4,300 km^{2})

Population (2013)
  - Total: 49,774
- Time zone: UTC+6 (East)

Eskeldi District (Kazakh: Ескелді ауданы, Eskeldı audany) is a district of Jetisu Region in Kazakhstan. The administrative center of the district is the settlement of Karabulak. Population: 49,774 (2013 estimate); 50,082 (2009 census results); 48,548 (1999 census results).
