= Yernjatap =

Yernjatap Երնջատափ
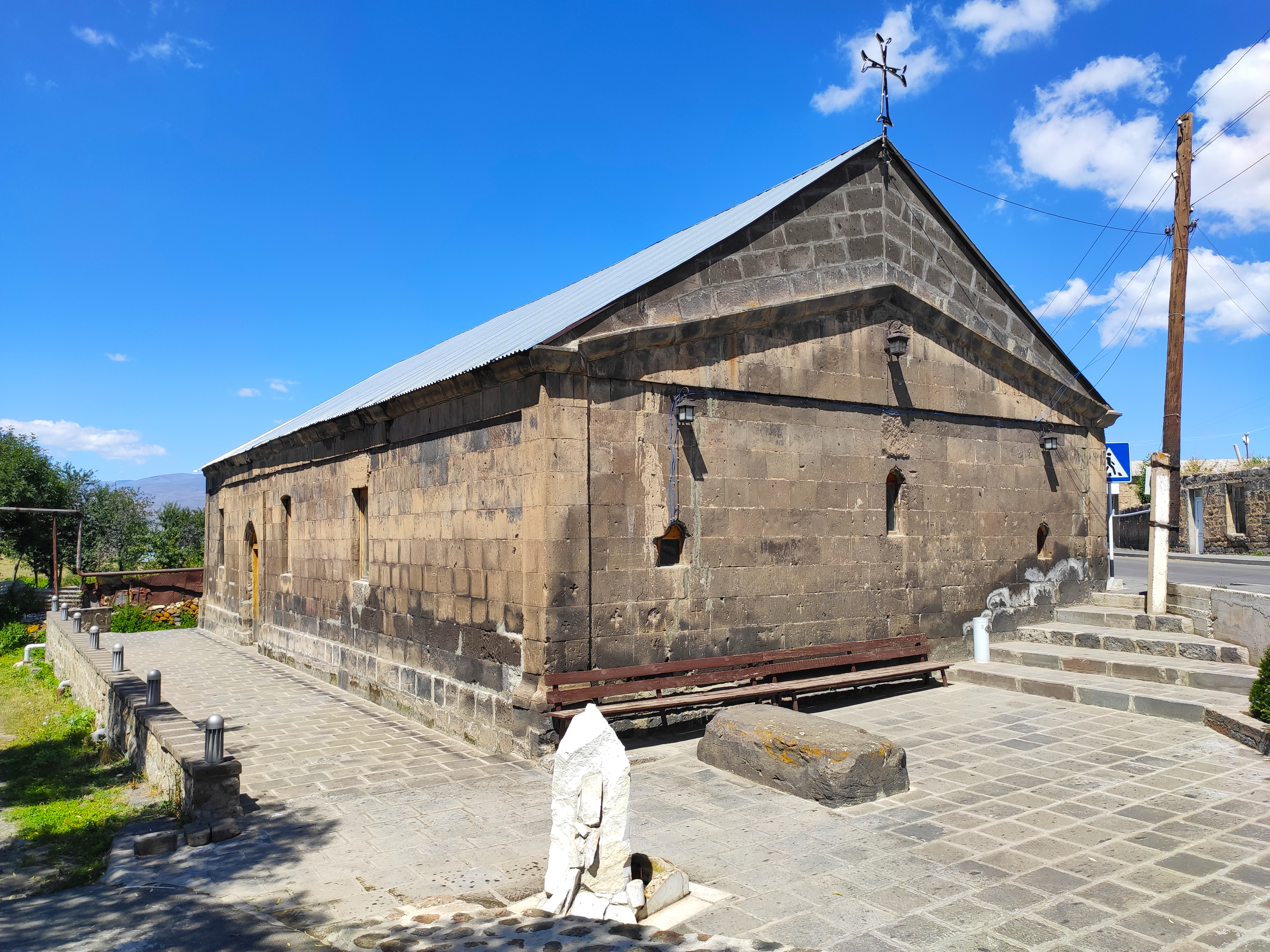

- Location within Armenia Location within Aragatsotn
- Coordinates: 40°27′11″N 44°27′51″E
- Country: Armenia
- Province: Aragatsotn
- Municipality: Aparan
- Elevation: 1,850 m (6,070 ft)

Population (2011)
  - Total: 611
- Time zone: UTC+4
  - Summer (DST): UTC+5

Yernjatap (Armenian: Երնջատափ) is a village in the Aparan Municipality of the Aragatsotn Province of Armenia.
