= Dizajvar =

Dizajvar ديزج ور
- Village
- Location within Iran
- Coordinates: 38°16′00″N 46°33′00″E
- Country: Iran
- Province: East Azerbaijan
- County: Heris
- Bakhsh: Khvajeh
- Rural District: Mavazekhan-e Shomali

Population (2006)
  - Total: 22
- Time zone: UTC+3:30 (IRST)
  - Summer (DST): UTC+4:30 (IRDT)

Dizajvar (Persian: ديزج ور, also Romanized as Dīzajvar; also known as Dizavar) is a village in Mavazekhan-e Shomali Rural District, Khvajeh District, Heris County, East Azerbaijan Province, Iran. At the 2006 census, its population was 22, in 7 families.
