= Kara-Bulak =

Kara-Bulak may refer to the following places in Kyrgyzstan:

- Kara-Bulak, Batken, a village in Batken District, Batken Region
- Kara-Bulak, Leylek, a village in Leylek District, Batken Region
- Kara-Bulak, Chuy, a village in Kemin District, Chuy Region
- Kara-Bulak, Nooken, a village in Nooken District, Jalal-Abad Region
- Kara-Bulak, Suzak, a village in Suzak District, Jalal-Abad Region
- Kara-Bulak, Alay, a village in Alay District, Osh Region
- Kara-Bulak, Aravan, a village in Aravan District, Osh Region
- Kara-Bulak, Kara-Kulja, a village in Kara-Kulja District, Osh Region
