= Oktyabrskoye, Prigorodny District, North Ossetia–Alania =

Rural locality in North Ossetia–Alania, Russia

Oktyabrskoye Sholkhi
- Settlement
- Location within North Ossetia–Alania Location within Republic of Ingushetia Location within Russia
- Coordinates: 43°03′08″N 44°44′52″E
- Country: Russia
- Region: North Ossetia-Alania
- District: Prigorodny District
- Time zone: UTC+3:00

Oktyabrskoye, formerly known as Sholkhi, (Note: Russian: Октябрьское; Iron Ossetic: Октябрыхъæу, romanized: Oktjabryqæu; Ingush: Шолхи, romanized: Šolxi.) is a rural locality (a selo) and the administrative center of Prigorodny District of the Republic of North Ossetia–Alania, Russia. Population: 10,436 (2010 census); 10,575 (2002 census); 10,171 (1989 Soviet census).
