= Qarabulaq, Gadabay =

Coordinates: 40.6838°N 45.8308°E

Qarabulaq (also, Garabulag) is a village in the municipality of Zahmetkend in the Gadabay District of Azerbaijan.
