= Qarabulaq, Khizi =

Garabulag
- Municipality
- Azerbaijani: Qarabulaq
- Location within Azerbaijan
- Coordinates: 40°50′00″N 49°05′23″E
- Country: Azerbaijan
- District: Khizi

Population
  - Total: 201
- Time zone: UTC+4 (AZT)
  - Summer (DST): UTC+5 (AZT)

Qarabulaq (also, Garabulag) is a village and the least populous municipality in the Khizi District of Azerbaijan. It has a population of 201. The municipality consists of the villages of Garabulag and Dizəvər.
