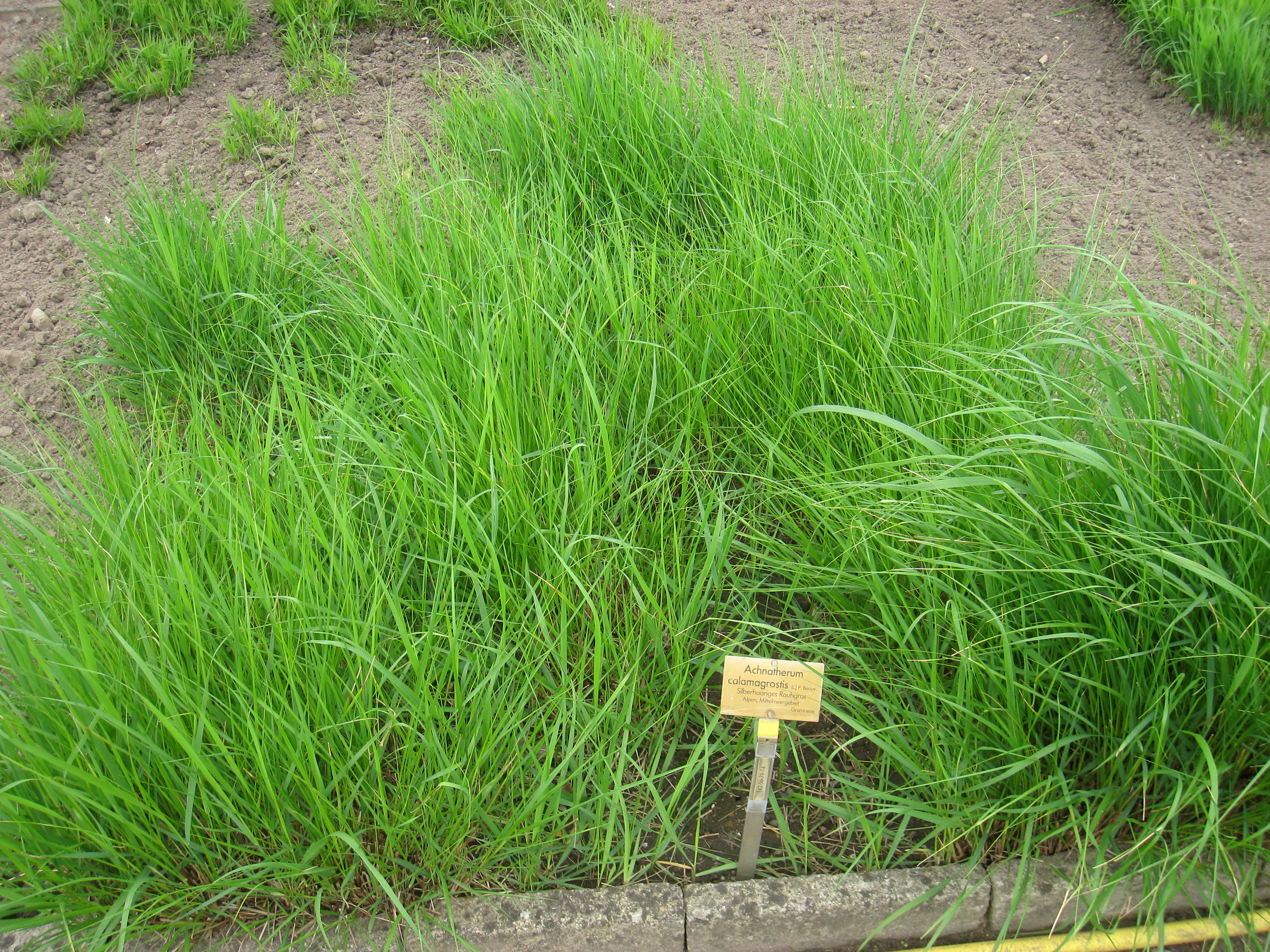

Scientific classification
- Kingdom: Plantae
- Clade: Embryophytes
- Clade: Tracheophytes
- Clade: Spermatophytes
- Clade: Angiosperms
- Clade: Monocots
- Clade: Commelinids
- Order: Poales
- Family: Poaceae
- Subfamily: Pooideae
- Genus: Achnatherum
- Species: A. calamagrostis

Binomial name
- Achnatherum calamagrostis (L.) Beauv.

Synonyms
- Agrostis argentea Lam.; Agrostis calamagrostis L.; Arundo calamagrostis (L.) Vest; Calamagrostis argentea DC.; Lasiagrostis calamagrostis (L.) Link; Stipa calamagrostis (L.) Wahlenb.; Stipa lasiagrostis G.Nicholson; Streptachne calamagrostis (L.) Dumort.

= Achnatherum calamagrostis =

Species of grass

Achnatherum calamagrostis (syn. Stipa calamagrostis) is a species of flowering plant in the grass family Poaceae, known by the common names spear grass, needle grass, and silver spike grass. It is an ornamental grass native to the clearings in the mountains of central and southern Europe, which grows in mounds of blue-green leaves and long, silvery plumes. A. calamagrostis can grow up to 91 cm in height.

Under the synonym Stipa calamagrostis, this plant, and the cultivars 'Allgäu' and 'Lemperg' have won the Royal Horticultural Society's Award of Garden Merit.

== Taxonomy ==
=== Original Description ===
The species Agrostis calamagrostis was first described by Linnaeus in 1759 in Systema naturae per regna tria naturae. It was later transferred to the genus Achnatherum by Palisot de Beauvois in 1812 in his Essai d'une Nouvelle Agrostographi.The original protologue for Agrostis calamgrostis reads (translated):

74. Agrostis. Calyx two‑valved; one‑flowered; corolla somewhat smaller; stigmas longitudinally hispid.

*Awned.

Calamagrostis. Panicle thickened; outer petal (lemma) wholly woolly, awned at the apex; culm branched. (Scheuchzer, Gramina, p. 146.) (Note: Johann Jakob Scheuchzer had earlier described the plant under the name Calamagrostis in Agrostographia (1719, p. 146), but this was a pre‑Linnaean usage. Linnaeus's 1759 account constitutes the valid basionym protologue for Agrostis calamagrostis.)
