= Tsori =

Rural locality in Ingushetia

Tsori Цори
- Aul

Other transcription(s)
  - Ingush: Цхьори
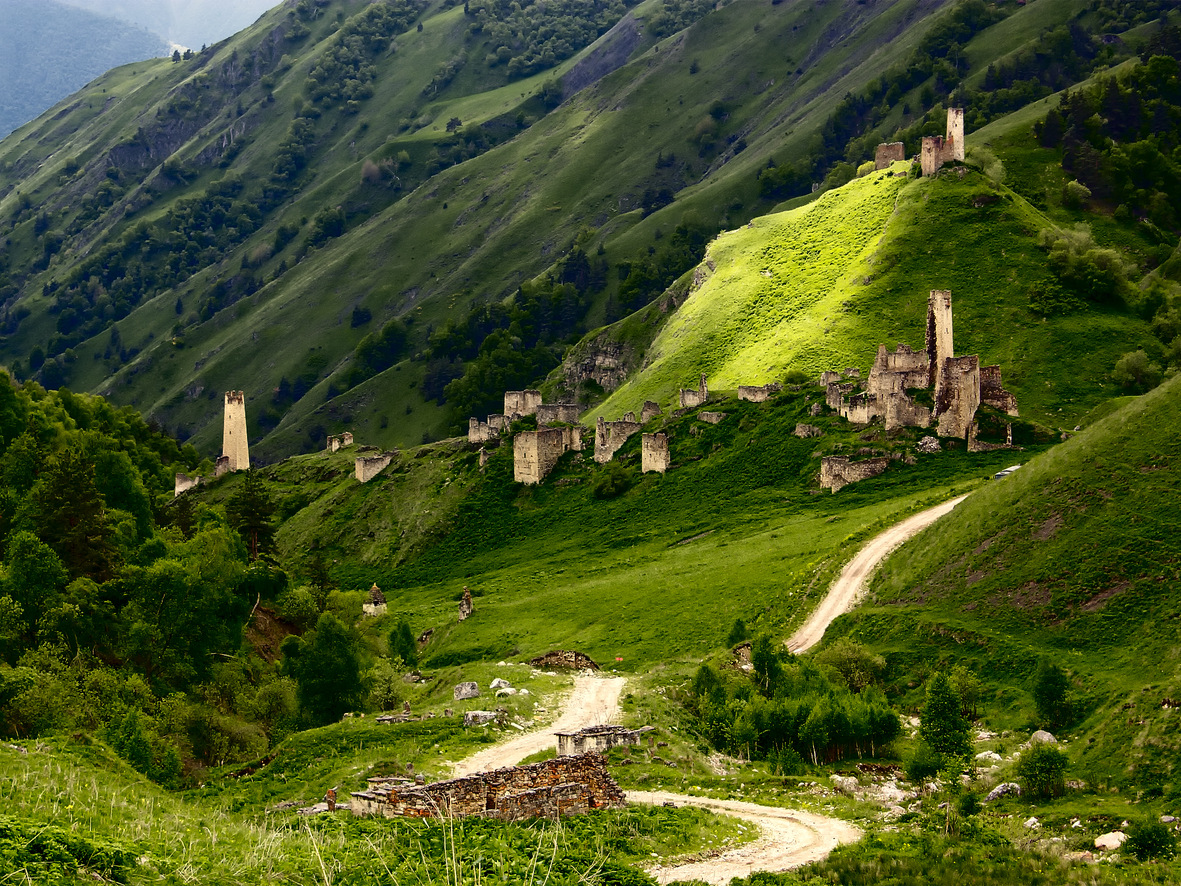
- Interactive map of Tsori
- Location of Tsori Tsori (Republic of Ingushetia)
- Coordinates: 42°48′27″N 45°05′42″E
- Country: Russia
- Federal subject: Ingushetia
- Elevation: 1,770 m (5,810 ft)

Population (2010 Census)
  - Total: 0
  - Estimate (2021): 0 )

Administrative status
  - Subordinated to: Dzheyrakhsky District
- Time zone: UTC+3 (MSK)
- Postal code: 386433
- OKTMO ID: 26620450246

Tsori (Russian: Цори, Ingush: Цхьори, romanized: Tsḥori) is a medieval village (aul) in Dzheyrakhsky District of Ingushetia. It is part of the Guli rural settlement.

Tsori is the ancestral settlement of Ingush clan (teip) of Tsoroy (Ingush: Цхьо́рой) and the historical center of Tsorin society.

== Name ==
The toponym is of ancient origin. It splits into two parts: Tsḥor-e, the "-e/-ye" part being a suffix of Ingush language. The "Tshor-" part is associated by Akhmad Suleymanov with the Ingush word tsḥar (цхьар) which means mail mesh helmet that covers the face and neck of a warrior. Ethnonym Tsoroy (a teip) takes its name from Tsori.

== History ==
Historically, Tsori was the center of Tsorin society. In the second half of the 18th century (1770s), the German researcher J.A. Güldenstädt indicated Tsori among the total number of Ingush villages and districts.

On 13 June 1785, a large Chechen force consisting of 500 men approached Tsori, in order to sack it. Learning of the plot, Tsorins attacked the Chechens during the night and defeated them.

In 1832, due to the collaboration of Ingush with Kazi-Mulla and the murder of a bailiff, Baron Rozen led a punitive expedition on Ingush and went through Dzheyrakh and Metskhal around Khamkhi and Tsori.

Baron F.F. Tornau, in his memoirs of the Ghalghai expedition at the end of June 1832, when approaching Tsori, reported that the main forces of the Ghalghaï entrenched themselves near Mount Gai (Khai), and arranged a powerful rockfall against the equestrian avant-garde, stopping any progress forward. In their description of the siege of Tsori, both generals Blaramberg and Tornau recall the difficulty of conquering one of the Tsori towers in which two Ghalghaï men barricaded themselves whilst fighting off a convoy of 3000 soldiers for 3 straight days. After several unsuccessful attempts the tower was mined with explosives and destroyed.

In 1842, Naib Muhammad Akhberdil made a raid on Tsori, from which he received serious injuries and would later die from them.

== Demographics ==
In 1883, Tsori had population of 260 completely consisting of Ghalghaï (Ingush)

The 1926 census showed that the majority of the village was ethnic Chechen (25 people) while the Ingush were a large minority (23 people).

== Bibliography ==
=== Russian sources ===
- Берже, А. П. (1859). Чечня и Чеченцы [Chechenya and Chechens] (in Russian). Тф.: Тип. Главного Управления Наместника Кавказского. pp. 1–140.
- Генко, А. Н. (1930). "Из культурного прошлого ингушей" [From the cultural past of the Ingush]. Записки коллегии востоковедов при Азиатском музее [Notes of the College of Orientalists at the Asian Museum] (in Russian). Vol. 5. Ленинград: Издательство Академии наук СССР. pp. 681–761.
- Гюльденштедт, И. А. (2002). Карпов, Ю. Ю. (ed.). Путешествие по Кавказу в 1770–1773 гг. [Journey through the Caucasus in 1770–1773.] (in Russian). Translated by Шафроновской, Т. К. Санкт-Петербург: Петербургское Востоковедение. pp. 1–508. ISBN 5-85803-213-3.
- Дубровин, Н. Ф. (1871). История войны и владычества русских на Кавказе [The history of the war and domination of Russians in the Caucasus] (in Russian). Vol. 1: bk. 1: Кавказ. СПб.: Тип. Департамента Уделов. pp. I–XVI, 1–640.
- Kurkiev, A. S. (1979). Основные вопросы лексикологии ингушского языка [The main questions of the lexicology of the Ingush language] (in Russian). Grozny: Chech.-Ing. kn. izd-vo. pp. 1–254.
- Общенациональная Комиссия по рассмотрению вопросов, связанных с определением территории и границ Ингушетии (2021). Всемирный конгресс ингушского народа (ed.). Доклад о границах и территории Ингушетии (общие положения) [Report on the borders and territory of Ingushetia (general provisions)] (archival documents, maps, illustrations) (in Russian). Назрань. pp. 1–175.
- Терскій Областной Статистическій Комитет (1885). Благовѣщенскій, Н. А. (ed.). Списокъ населенныхъ мѣстъ Терской области: По свѣдѣніям къ 1-му января 1883 года [List of populated areas of the Terek region: According to information on January 1st of 1883] (in Russian). Владикавказъ: Типографія Терскаго Областнаго Правленія. pp. 1–78.
- Suleymanov, A. S. (1978). Shaykhiev, A. Kh. (ed.). Топонимия Чечено-Ингушетии. Часть 2. Горная Ингушетия (юго-запад) и Чечня (центр и юго-восток) [Toponymy of Checheno-Ingushetia. Part 2. Mountainous Ingushetia (southwest) and Chechnya (center and southeast)] (in Russian). Grozny: Chech.-Ing. kn. izd-vo. pp. 1–233.
- Chakhkiev, J. Yu. (2003). Aliroev, I. A. (ed.). Древности горной Ингушетии [Antiquities of mountainous Ingushetia] (in Russian). Vol. 1. Nazran: Kavkazskaya zdravnitsa. pp. 1–144.
- Юров, А. (1883). Чернявский, И. С. (ed.). "II: 1844-й год на Кавказе" [2: Year 1844 in the Caucasus]. Кавказский сборник (in Russian). Vol. 7. Тф.: Тип. Окружного Штаба. pp. 157–382.
- "Закон Республики Ингушетия от 23 февраля 2009 года № 5-рз "Об установлении границ муниципальных образований Республики Ингушетия и наделении их статусом сельского, городского поселения, муниципального района и городского округа"" [Law of the Republic of Ingushetia dated February 23, 2009 No. 5–section "On establishing the boundaries of municipalities of the Republic of Ingushetia and granting them the status of rural, urban settlements, municipal districts and urban districts"]. docs.cntd.ru (in Russian). 2009. Archived from the original on 2018-01-28.
