= Qarabulaq, Quba =

Garabulag
- Azerbaijani: Qarabulaq
- Location within Azerbaijan
- Coordinates: 41°07′N 48°32′E
- Country: Azerbaijan
- District: Quba
- Time zone: UTC+4 (AZT)
  - Summer (DST): UTC+5 (AZT)

Qarabulaq (also, Garabulag) is a village in the Quba District of Azerbaijan.
