= Qarabulaq, Gobustan =

Garabulag
- Azerbaijani: Qarabulaq
- Location within Azerbaijan
- Coordinates: 40°36′19″N 49°01′27″E
- Country: Azerbaijan
- District: Gobustan
- Time zone: UTC+4 (AZT)
  - Summer (DST): UTC+5 (AZT)

Qarabulaq (also, Garabulag) is a village in the Gobustan District of Azerbaijan.
