= Karabulak, Kazakhstan =

Karabulak Қарабұлақ
- settlement
- Location in Kazakhstan
- Coordinates: 44°54′32″N 78°29′32″E
- Country: Kazakhstan
- Region: Jetisu Region
- District: Eskeldi District

Population (2009)
  - Total: 16,037
- Time zone: UTC+6 (Omsk Time)
- Postal code: 040500
- Area code: 72836

Karabulak (Kazakh: Қарабұлақ, Qarabūlaq) is a settlement in Eskeldi District in Jetisu Region of south-eastern Kazakhstan. It is the capital of the district. Population: 16,037 (2009 census results); 14,873 (1999 census results).
