= Gömür, Shabran =

Gomur
- Azerbaijani: Gömür
- Location within Azerbaijan
- Coordinates: 41°06′37″N 48°43′14″E
- Country: Azerbaijan
- District: Shabran
- Time zone: UTC+4 (AZT)
  - Summer (DST): UTC+5 (AZT)

Gömür (also, Gomur, Garabulag) is a village in the Shabran District of Azerbaijan.
