= Johann Anton Güldenstädt =

Baltic German naturalist and explorer

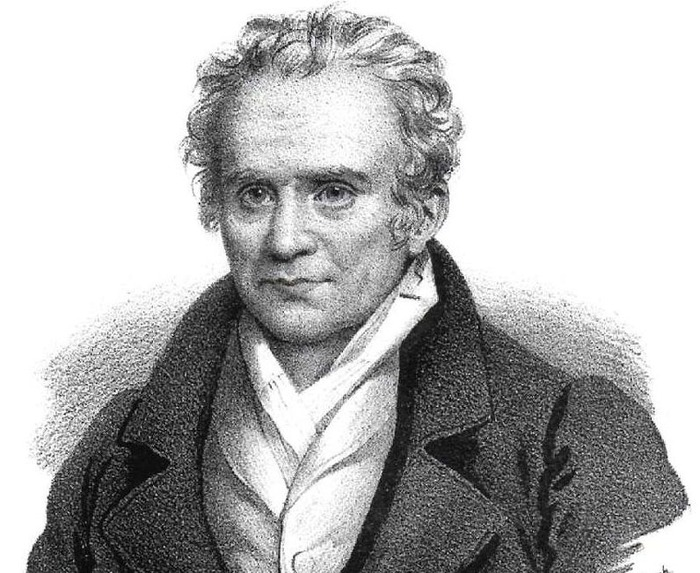
- Born: 26 April 1745 Old Style; 7 May New Style; Riga, Latvia
- Died: 23 March 1781 (aged 35) 3 April New Style; St. Petersburg, Russia
- Education: Berlin, University of Frankfurt (Oder)
- Known for: The first systematic study of the Caucasus
- Scientific career
- Fields: Naturalist and explorer
- Institutions: Russian Imperial Academy of Sciences
- Patrons: Catherine the Great
- Author abbrev. (botany): Gueldenst.
- Author abbrev. (zoology): Güldenstädt

Johann Anton Güldenstädt (26 April 1745 in Riga, Latvia – 23 March 1781 in St. Petersburg, Russia) was a Baltic German naturalist and explorer in Russian service.

Güldenstädt lost both his parents early, and from 1763 onwards studied pharmacy, botany and natural history in Berlin. At the age of 22, he obtained his doctorate in medicine at the University of Frankfurt in 1767. In the following year, he joined the Russian Imperial Academy of Sciences' expedition sent by Catherine II of Russia to explore the Russian empire's southern frontier. Güldenstädt travelled through Ukraine and the Astrakhan region, as well as the northern Caucasus and Georgia, both of which were almost entirely beyond the borders of the Russian empire. In March 1775 he returned to St Petersburg. The results of the expedition and Güldenstädt's edited expedition journal were published after his death by Peter Simon Pallas in Reisen durch Russland und im Caucasischen Gebürge (Travels in Russia and the Mountains of the Caucasus) (1787–1791).

The expedition contributed greatly to the fields of biology, geology, geography, and particularly linguistics. Güldenstädt took detailed notes on the languages of the region. After the expedition, which definitively established Güldenstädt's reputation at the Academy, he continued to work as a naturalist.

Güldenstädt's expedition was the first systematic study of the Caucasus. As was typical of contemporary expeditions organized in the spirit of the Enlightenment (including the later American Lewis and Clark Expedition), it was tasked with the observation and description of virtually every aspect of the region under study. This included both its "natural" attributes — flora, fauna, geography, and geology — and its peoples, economy, and government. In this sense it was both a scientific expedition and a mission of reconnaissance to learn more about a region that was important in the simultaneous Russian war with the Ottomans, of which the Caucasus was a theater, with the Georgians acting as Russian allies. Immediately following the expedition, Russian interest in the region, particularly Georgia, grew markedly, culminating in the Treaty of Georgievsk, which made East Georgia a Russian protectorate.

In 1781, he died from an outbreak of fever in St. Petersburg.

== Legacy ==
Güldenstädt first described the jungle cat in 1776 in his article Chaus – Animal feli adfine descriptum.
He is commemorated in the names of:

- Güldenstädt's redstart

== Publications ==
- Chaus – Animal feli adfine descriptum. Commentarii Academiae Scientiarum Imperialis Petropolitanae Volume 20, St. Petersburg 1776. Pp. 483
- Reisen durch Rußland und im Caucasischen Gebürge. Russisch-Kayserliche Akademie der Wissenschaften (Russian Imperial Academy of Sciences). St. Petersburg, Volume 1, 1787; Volume 2, 1791.
- Путешествие по Кавказу в 1770–1773 гг (Puteshestvie po Kavkazu v 1770-1773 gg). Translated by T. K. Shafranovskaia. St. Petersburg: Peterburgskoe Vostokovedenie, 2002.

== See also ==
- List of Baltic German explorers
- Google Books

== Sources ==
- "Гюльденштедт, Иоанн-Антон" . Brockhaus and Efron Encyclopedic Dictionary (in Russian). 1906.
- Gnucheva, V. F. et al. 1940. Materialy dlia istorii ekspeditsii Akademii nauk v XVIII i XIX vekakh: khronologicheskie obzory i opisanie arkhivnykh materialov. Moscow: Izdatelstvo Akademii nauk SSSR.
- Kopelevich, Iudif’ Khaimovna 1997. Iogann Anton Gil’denshtedt, 1745-1781. Moscow: Nauka.
- Kosven, Mark Osipovich 1955. “Materialy po istorii etnografii Kavkaza v russkoi nauke”. Kavkazskii etnograficheskii sbornik. Vols. I, III. Ed. V. K. Gardanov. Moscow: Izdatelstvo Akademii nauk SSSR. I, Pp. 272–290. II, Pp. 267–281
- Lavrov, L. I. 1976. “K 250-letiiu akademicheskogo kavkazovedeniia v Rossii.” Kavkazskii etnograficheskii sbornik. Vol. VI. Ed. V. K. Gardanov. Moscow: Izdatelstvo Akademii nauk SSSR. Pp. 3–10
