= Akqi Town =

Akqi Town 阿合奇镇 (Chinese) ئاقچى بازىرى (Uyghur) اقچئي شاارچاسى (Kyrgyz) Aheqi
- Town
- Location of the town
- Coordinates: 40.9365473056°N 78.4022687958°E
- Country: People's Republic of China
- Autonomous region: Xinjiang
- Prefecture: Kizilsu
- County: Akqi

Area
  - Total: 1,458 km^{2} (563 sq mi)

Population (2017)
  - Total: 13,890
- Time zone: UTC+8 (China Standard Time)
- Website: www.xjahq.gov.cn/ahqtown.htm

Akqi Town (also as Aqchi Town or Ahecqi Town; Chinese: 阿合奇镇; pinyin: Āhéqí zhèn) is a town and the county seat of Akqi County in Xinjiang Uygur Autonomous Region, China. Located in the middle of the county, it covers an area of 1,454 kilometres with a population of 8,251 (as of 2018), of them are from Kyrgyz, Han and Uyghur peoples. The town has 2 communities, 3 administrative villages and 8 unincorporated villages under jurisdiction, its seat is at Nandajie Street (南大街).

== History ==
It was formerly Uq (吾曲), part of the 1st district in 1950 and the 2nd district in 1954. The Uq Commune (吾曲公社) was established in 1962, and renamed to Hongqi Commune (红旗公社), Uq Commune in 1978. It was organized as a town named it after Akqi County in 1984.

== Communities and villages ==
The town was divided into 2 communities and 3 villages in 2008. The community of Youyilu (友谊路社区) was established in 2013, the two communities of Nandajie and Yanhelu were amalgamated in 2017. There are 5 communities and 3 villages under its jurisdiction.

- Health Road (Jiankanglu) Community (健康路社区, ساغلاملىق يولى مەھەللىسى, ساعلاملىق جولۇ قوومدۇق قونۇشۇ)
- Peace Road (Hepinglu) Community (和平路社区, تىنچلىق يولى مەھەللىسى, تىنچتىق جولۇ قوومدۇق قونۇشۇ)
- Friendship Road (Youyilu) Community (友谊路社区, دوستلۇق يولى مەھەللىسى, دوستۇق جولۇ قوومدۇق قونۇشۇ)
- South Main Street (Nandajie) Community (南大街社区, جەنۇبىي چوڭ كوچا مەھەللىسى, تۉشتۉك چوڭ كۅچۅ قوومدۇق قونۇشۇ)
- Yanhe Road (Yanhelu) Community (沿河路社区, يەنخې يولى مەھەللىسى, يانحە جولۇ قوومدۇق قونۇشۇ)
- Jalangchi Village (加朗奇村, جالاڭچى كەنتى, جالاڭچئى قىشتاعى)
- Pichan Village (皮昌村, پىچان كەنتى, پئچان قىشتاعى)
- Uch Village (吾曲村, ئۇچ كەنتى, ۇچ قىشتاعى)

== See also ==
- List of township-level divisions of Xinjiang
