= Muji Township, Kizilsu =

Muji 木吉乡 (Chinese) مۇجى يېزىسى (Uyghur) موجۇ ايىلى (Kyrgyz)
- Township
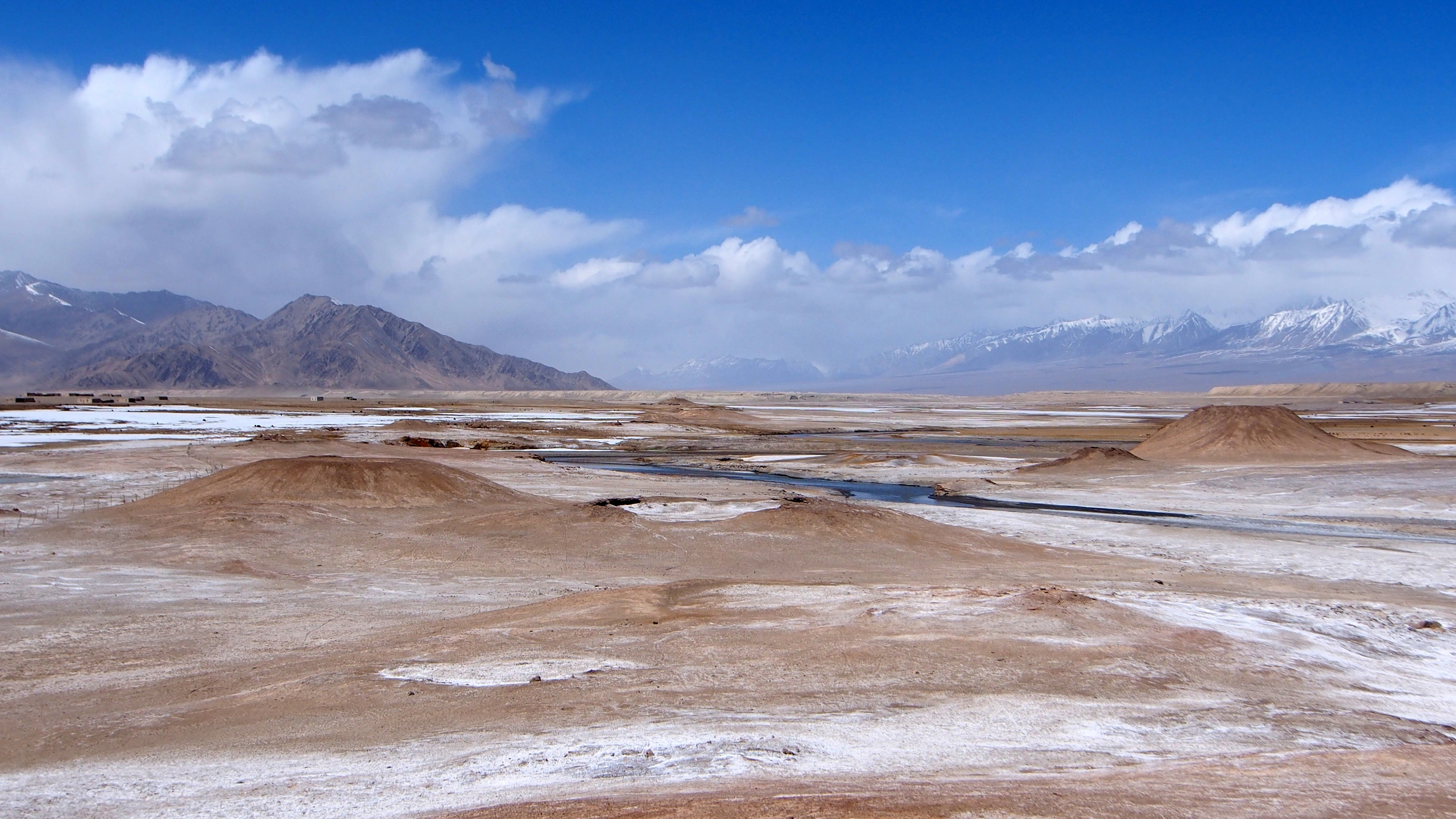
- Muji Volcanoes

- Location of the township
- Coordinates: 39.0041020615°N 74.4375532785°E
- Country: People's Republic of China
- Autonomous region: Xinjiang
- Prefecture: Kizilsu
- County: Akto

Area
  - Total: 7,602 km^{2} (2,935 sq mi)

Population (2015)
  - Total: 4,426

Ethnic groups
  - Major ethnic groups: Kyrgyz
- Time zone: UTC+8 (China Standard Time)
- postal code: 845557
- Area code: 653022 205
- Website: www.xjakt.gov.cn

Muji (مۇجى يېزىسى Chinese: 木吉乡; pinyin: Mùjí Xiāng) is a township of Akto County, Kizilsu Kyrgyz Autonomous Prefecture in Xinjiang Uygur Autonomous Region, China. Located in the northwestern part of the county, the township covers an area of 7,602 square kilometers with a population of 4,426 (as of 2015). It has 4 administrative villages under its jurisdiction. Its seat is at Muji Village (木吉村).

== Name ==
The name of Muji is from Kyrgyz language, meaning "the mudstone ejected from a volcano" (火山喷出的泥砂石). The Muji Volcano (木吉火山) in its territory is known as the Karitemir Volcanos (喀日铁米尔火山群). According to research, the Muji volcano was formed 1,500 years ago, it is the only volcanic crater in Xinjiang with the highest altitude, also one of the most typical craters in the world. Surrounded by mountain wetlands, it forms a natural landscape of glaciers, glacial lakes, and ice caves. The place is named after that.

== History ==
In 1962, Muji Commune (木吉公社) was established.

In 1967 during the Cultural Revolution, Muji Commune was renamed Qianjin Commune (前进公社).

In 1984, the commune became Muji Township.

== Geography and resources ==
The township of Muji is located to the north of county seat Akto Town, in the east of Pamir Plateau, and between 73°26′- 74°52′ east longitude and 38°31′- 39°29′ north latitude. The township is bordered by Boritokay and Bostanterak townships of Wuqia County, and Bulungkol Township to the east, by the Kyrgyz Republic and Republic of Tajikistan to the west. The township has a boundary line of 296 kilometers with 42 mountain passes, including 9 important passes.

Its maximum distance west to east is 72.4 kilometers, and the maximum distance north to south 105 kilometers. Its total area is 7,602 square kilometers, accounting for one-third of the total area of Akto County and one-tenth of that of Kizilsu Prefecture. The seat of the township is 280 kilometers away from the county seat Akto Town. As of 2015, it has 1,176 households with a population of 4,426, all are Kirgiz people.

Muji is a highland with an extremely cold climate and an average elevation of 3,700 meters, its production and living area is 3,500 to 4,500 meters above sea level, which is the highest in Kizilsu Prefecture. Most areas in the township have undulating hills and gullies. There are more than a dozen mountain ranges, nearly 100 mountain peaks and large glaciers. The annual average temperature is 0.7 °C, the average temperature in January is -12.5 °C, and the average temperature in July is 11 °C. The annual precipitation is 80–200 mm, the sunshine duration is 3,796 hours. The climate is active, with windy weather for 230 days throughout a year. There are three water systems of Muji River, Karazhak River (喀拉佐克河) and Malkansu River (马尔坎苏河) in the territory.

Along the banks of the Muji River are large-scale alpine meadow pastures with abundant water resources and excellent grass quality. it is the main grassland in the land. There are rare animals such as snow cocks, snow leopards, yellow sheep and argali in the territory; rare plants such as sand holly and snow lotus; mineral resources mainly include gold, copper, asbestos, crystal, iron, aluminum and precious stones.

== Administrative divisions ==
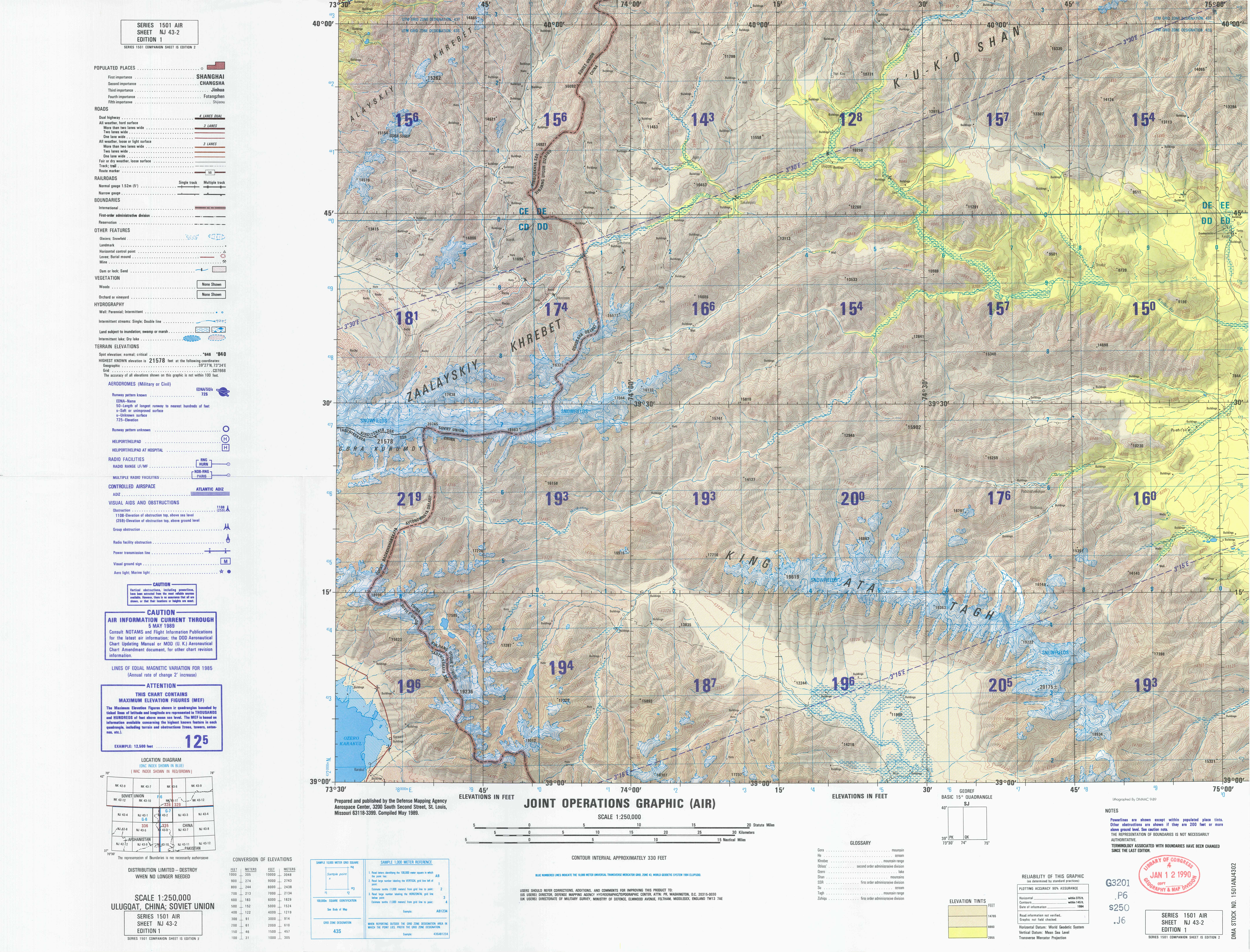
Map of the region including Muji (northern part) (DMA, 1989)

Map of the region including Muji (southern part) (DMA, 1988)

The township has 4 administration villages under its jurisdiction.

4 administration villages

- Bulaq Village (Bulakecun) (布拉克村, بۇلاق كەنتى, بۇلاق قىشتاعى)
  - 39°06′00″N 074°17′49″E
- Chongrang Village (Qiongrangcun) (琼让村, چۈڭراڭ كەنتى, چۅڭراڭ قىشتاعى)
  - 38°56′55″N 074°18′11″E
- Kuntibes Village (Kuntibiesicun,) (昆提别斯村, كۈنتىيبەس كەنتى, كۉنتىيبەس قىشتاعى)
  - 38°55′37″N 074°39′03″E
- Muji Village (Mujicun) (木吉村, مۇجى كەنتى, موجۇ قىشتاعى)
  - 39°00′16″N 074°26′12″E

Unincorporated villages

- Kengsaz (康萨孜)

== Demographics ==
Historical population
Year	Pop.	±% p.a.
2000	3,283	—
2010	3,892	+1.72%

As of 1997, the population of Muji Township was 99.8% Kyrgyz.

== Economy ==
Yak, oxen, horses, camels, and sheep are pastured in the large grasslands of the Muji River Valley. Mineral resources include gold, copper, asbestos, quartz, and iron.

== See also ==
- List of township-level divisions of Xinjiang
