= Jigin =

Jigin 吉根乡 (Chinese) جىغىن يېزىسى (Uyghur) جىعىن ايىلى (Kyrgyz) Jigen
- Township
- Location of the township
- Coordinates: 39.8196419001°N 74.106865192°E
- Country: People's Republic of China
- Autonomous region: Xinjiang
- Prefecture: Kizilsu
- County: Ulugqat (Wuqia)
- Seat: Saz Village (Sazi; 萨孜村)

Area
  - Total: 1,452 km^{2} (561 sq mi)

Population (2017)
  - Total: 2,467
  - Density: 1.699/km^{2} (4.400/sq mi)

Ethnic groups
  - Major ethnic groups: Kyrgyz
- Time zone: UTC+8 (China Standard Time)
- Website: www.xjwqx.gov.cn/sitemap.htm

Jigin Township (جىغىن يېزىسى / جىعىن ايىلى / Jigen Chinese: 吉根乡; pinyin: Jígēn Xiāng) is considered to be the westernmost township of China located in Ulugqat County (Wuqia), Kizilsu Kyrgyz Autonomous Prefecture, Xinjiang Uygur Autonomous Region. The township covers an area of 1,452 square kilometers. It has four villages under its jurisdiction and its seat is at Saz Village (萨孜村).

== History ==
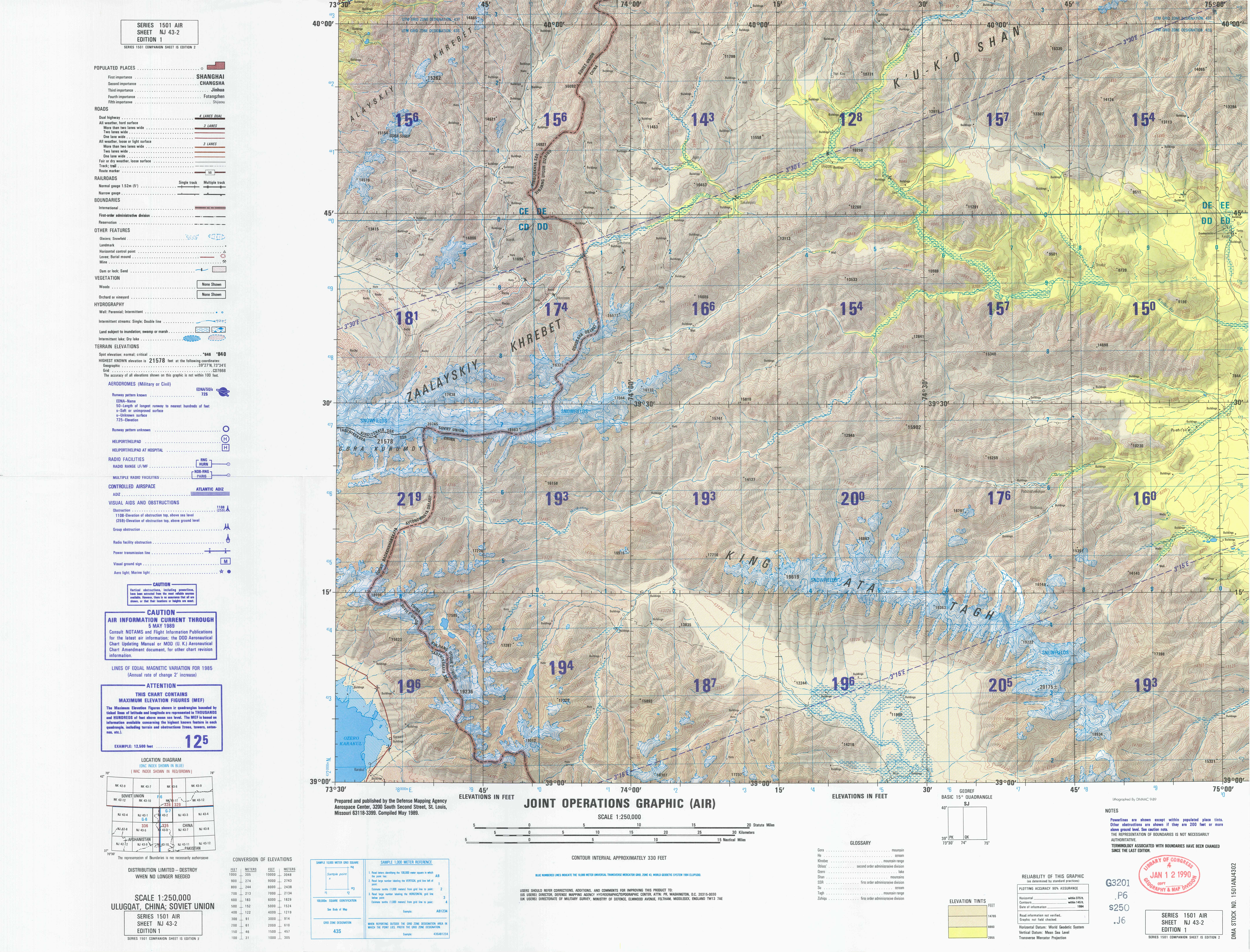
Map including Jigin (labeled as Jigen) (below 14³) (DMA, 1989)

The word Jigin comes from the Kyrgyz language, which means "get-together". It was part of the 4th Township of the 2nd district of Wuqia County in 1950 and part of Ulugqat Commune (乌鲁克恰提公社) in 1958.

Jigin Commune (吉根公社) was formed from Ulugqat Commune in 1962. In 1968 during the Cultural Revolution, the commune was renamed Fanxiu Commune (反修公社). The original name was restored in 1980.

In 1984, the commune was reorganized as a township.

== Geography ==
Jigin Township is located 120 kilometers west of the county seat Wuqia Town and 25 kilometers away east of Arkaxtam Port on the China–Kyrgyzstan border. It is adjacent to Ulugqat Township in the east and Oksalur Township in the south, and borders with the Kyrgyz Republic in the northwest with a boundary line of 108 kilometers.

Jigen is located between 2,700 and 5,700 meters above sea level, with an average annual temperature of 6.2 degrees and an annual precipitation of 2.2 ml. The township has 253 hectares of cultivated grassland, 870 square kilometers of natural grassland, 2,667 hectares of natural forest. There are 18 mountain passes in the township.

Simhana Village is the westernmost settlement in China, marked by the "Western Pole of China" monument.

== Politics and government ==
=== Settlements ===
The township has 4 administration villages and 4 unincorporated villages under its jurisdiction.

- Saqal Village (Sahalecun) (萨哈勒村, ساقال كەنتى, ساقال قىشتاعى)
- Saz Village (Sazicun) (萨孜村, ساز كەنتى, ساز قىشتاعى)
  - 39.816197°N 74.089693°E
- Simhana Village (Simuhanacun) (斯木哈纳村, سىمخانا كەنتى, زىمحانا قىشتاعى)
  - 39°42′46″N 073°57′49″E
  - Simhana is Kyrgyz for 'phone room' (电话房). Simhana is 113 km (70 mi) west of the Ulugqat (Wuqia) county seat on the southern bank of the Kezi River. Simhama is considered to be the westernmost village of China, located near Erkeshtam, Kyrgyzstan.
- Qaraterek (Halatieliekecun) (哈拉铁列克村, قاراتېرەك كەنتى, قاراتەرەك قىشتاعى)

=== CCP Party Secretaries ===
- Zhong Zi'ou (钟梓欧), 2017

== Demographics ==
Historical population
Year	Pop.	±% p.a.
2000	2,069	—
2010	2,090	+0.10%

As of 1997, the population of Jigin was 99.6% Kyrgyz.

== Notable people ==
- Ishaq Beg Munonov, Kyrgyz leader of the Second East Turkestan Republic
- Burmakhan Moldo (布茹玛汗·毛勒朵, بۇرماحان مولدو), wife in a herding family; an on-foot border guard of fifty years for which received an award from CCP General Secretary Xi Jinping

== See also ==
- China–Kyrgyzstan border
- List of extreme points of China
