= Bizhou =

Bizhou may refer to:

== Modern locations ==
- Bizhou, Heilongjiang (碧洲), a town in Xinlin District, Da Hinggan Ling Prefecture, Heilongjiang, China
- Bizhou, Jiangxi (碧洲), a town in Suichuan County
- Bizhou Village (碧洲村), a village in Weishan, Xinhua County

== Historical prefectures ==
- Bizhou (泌州), the name of Tangzhou during the rules of Later Liang, Later Tang and Later Jin in early 10th century

== See also ==
- Bi (disambiguation)
