= Targen =

Targen 塔尔根镇 Ta'ergen
- Town
- Location within Heilongjiang Location within China
- Coordinates: 52°14′32″N 124°43′8″E
- Country: China
- Province: Heilongjiang
- Prefecture: Daxing'anling Prefecture
- District: Xinlin District
- Time zone: UTC+8 (CST)

Targen or Ta'ergen (simplified Chinese: 塔尔根; traditional Chinese: 塔爾根; pinyin: Tǎ'ěrgēn) is a town in Xinlin District, Daxing'anling Prefecture, Heilongjiang, China.
