= List of extreme points of China =

This is a list of the extreme points of China, compared both globally and within the country.

Extreme points of China (approximate)

== Global extreme points in China ==
=== Altitude ===
- The highest point on Earth measured from sea level is the summit of Mount Everest, Tibet Autonomous Region on the Sino-Nepal border. While measurements of its height vary slightly, the elevation of its peak is usually given as 8,848 m (29,029 ft) above sea level.
- The lowest point in Central Asia is 154 metres (505 ft) below sea level at Ayding Lake within the Turpan Depression, near the oasis city of Turpan Pendi, Xinjiang.

==== Highest attainable by transportation ====
The following are all located partially or completely in the Tibet Autonomous Region.

- Road (mountain pass): Possibly Semo La 5,565 m (18,258 ft), depending on definition of "attainable by transportation". There may be higher motorable passes in Tibet in areas affected by lack of information and restricted access. See Khardung La, 5,359 m (17,582 ft) for more information.
- Train: Tanggula Mountain Pass, in the Tanggula Mountains, on the Qinghai–Tibet border 5,072 m (16,640 ft)
- Airport: Daocheng Yading Airport, Sichuan province 4,411 metres (14,472 ft)

==== Highest geographical features ====
The following are all located partially or completely in the Tibet Autonomous Region.

- Lake: Lhagba Pool on the northeast slopes of Mount Everest, at an altitude of 6,368 metres (20,892 ft).
- River: One candidate from among many possibilities is the Ating Ho (meaning Ho river), which flows into the Aong Tso (Hagung Tso), a large lake about 6,100 metres (20,013 ft) at its source at 32°49′30″N 81°03′45″E. A very large high river is the Yarlung Tsangpo, the Tibetan section of the Brahmaputra River, whose main stem, the Maquan River has its source at about 6,020 metres (19,751 ft) above sea level at 30°48′59″N 82°42′45″E.
- Island: There are a number of islands in the Orba Co lake, which is located at an altitude of 5,209 metres (17,090 ft).

=== Remoteness ===
- The Eurasian pole of inaccessibility, the point on land farthest from any ocean, is located approximately 320 km (200 mi) from Ürümqi, Xinjiang, at 46°16.8′N 86°40.2′E (in the Dzoosotoyn Elisen Desert). This position is at a distance of approximately 2,648 km (1,645 mi) from the nearest coastline.

== Country extreme points ==
=== Altitude ===
- Maximum: Mount Everest, Tibet, 8,849.87 m (29,035.0 ft) 27°59′17″N 86°55′31″E
- Minimal: Ayding Lake, Turfan Depression, Xinjiang, −154 m (−505 ft) 42.78°N 89.34°E

=== Latitude and longitude ===
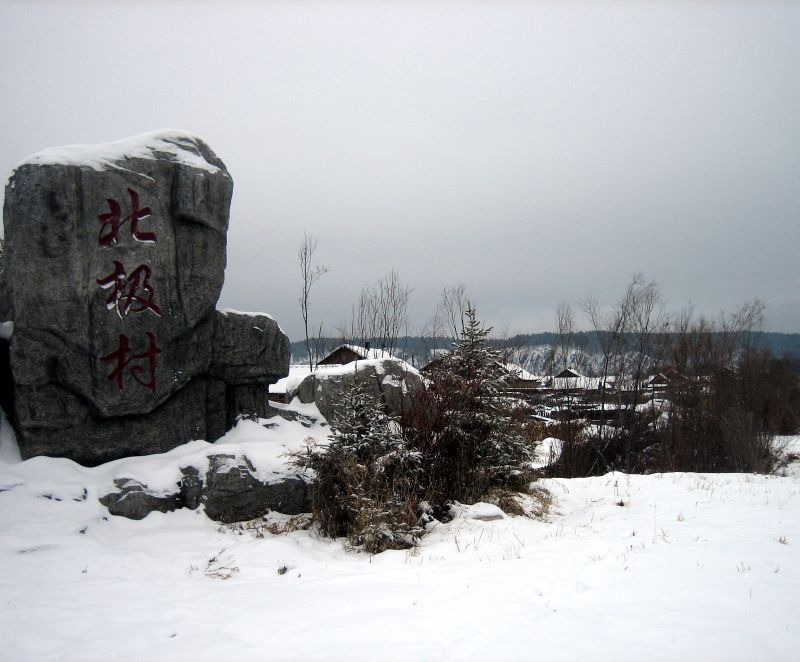
Northernmost Point

- North: Mohe County, Heilongjiang 53°33′N 123°16′E
- Continental South: Hai'an, Guangdong 20°14′N 109°56′E
- Total South: Hainan's southernmost tip (18°09′33″N 109°34′27″E, south-east of Sanya) is the undisputed southernmost point. James Shoal 03°58′26″N 112°20′56″E is the southernmost point of disputed Chinese territory. It is also claimed by Taiwan and Malaysia.
- West: Akto County, Xinjiang south-west of Ulugqat, on the China–Tajikistan border 39°22′48″N 73°30′00″E north of the Markansu River (瑪爾坎蘇河)
- East: Fuyuan County, Heilongjiang, on the west bank of the Ussuri River 47°44′09″N 134°46′08″E

==== Railway stations ====
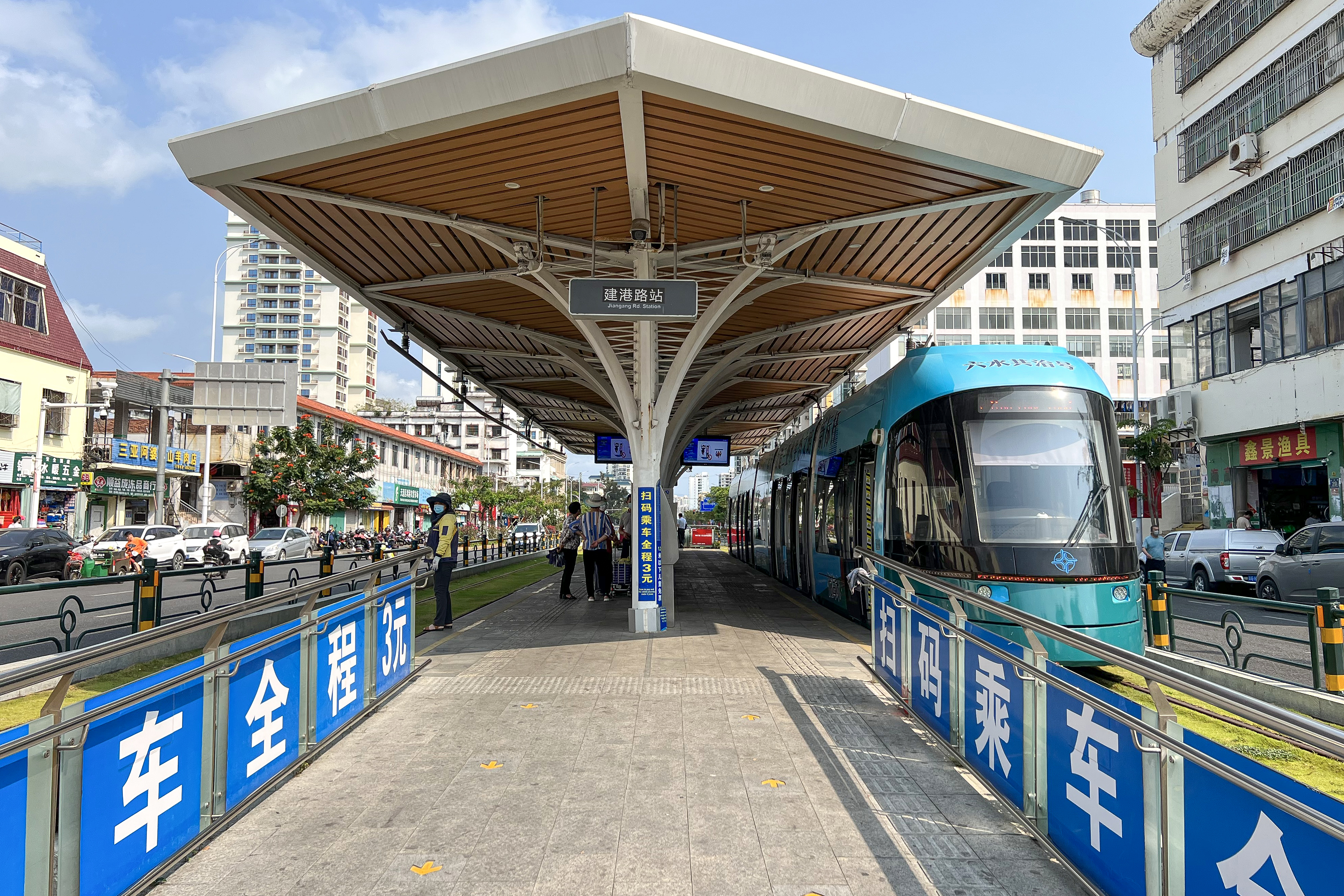
Jiangang Rd. station of Sanya Tram is the southernmost rail transport station among all rail systems in China as of 2023

- North: Mohe railway station, Heilongjiang 52°59′14″N 122°30′01″E
- South: Old Sanya railway station, Hainan (abandoned) 18°15′09″N 109°29′51″E
- West: Kashgar railway station, Xinjiang 39°29′31″N 76°02′47″E
- East: Fuyuan railway station; On 19 December 2012, China extended rail service eastwards to Fuyuan, 17 hours northeast of Harbin.

==== Townships and villages ====
- West: considered to be Simhana (Simuhana) Village in Jigin (Jigen) Township, Ulugqat County (Wuqia), Kizilsu Kyrgyz Autonomous Prefecture, Xinjiang

== See also ==
- Extreme points of Earth
  - Extreme points of Afro-Eurasia
    - Extreme points of Eurasia
      - Extreme points of Asia
- Geography of China
- Geographic Information Systems in China
