= Beiji, Heilongjiang =

Town in Mohe

Beiji 北极镇
- Town
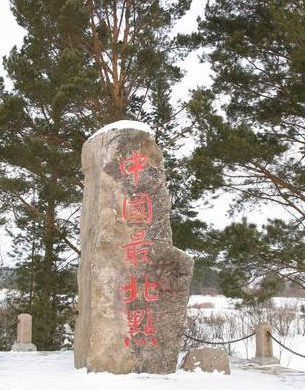
- "Northernmost Place in China" marker

- Location in Heilongjiang
- Coordinates: 53°28′41″N 122°21′12″E
- Country: China
- Province: Heilongjiang
- Prefecture: Daxing'anling Prefecture
- County-level city: Mohe

Area
  - Total: 2,380 km^{2} (920 sq mi)

Population (2020)
  - Total: 2,373
  - Density: 1/km^{2} (2.6/sq mi)
- Time zone: UTC+8 (China Standard)
- License plate: 黑P

Beiji (simplified Chinese: 北极镇; traditional Chinese: 北極鎮; pinyin: Běijí Zhèn), formerly Mohe Township, is a town located in Mohe, Daxing'anling Prefecture. It is the northernmost town in China, and is famous for its tourism. Beiji spans an area of about 2,380 square kilometres (920 sq mi). As of 2020, Beiji has a population of 2,373, giving it a population density of 1 person per square kilometer.

== Climate ==
Beiji has a humid continental climate (Dwb) bordering on a subarctic climate (Dwc) with short, warm summers and long, bitterly cold winters.

Climate data for Beiji Village, Mohe, elevation 296 m (971 ft), (1991–2020 normals)
Month	Jan	Feb	Mar	Apr	May	Jun	Jul	Aug	Sep	Oct	Nov	Dec	Year
Mean daily maximum °C (°F)	−19.6 (−3.3)	−11.9 (10.6)	−1.0 (30.2)	9.3 (48.7)	18.2 (64.8)	25.4 (77.7)	26.8 (80.2)	23.9 (75.0)	17.3 (63.1)	5.5 (41.9)	−10.2 (13.6)	−20.9 (−5.6)	5.2 (41.4)
Daily mean °C (°F)	−27.9 (−18.2)	−23.2 (−9.8)	−11.4 (11.5)	1.5 (34.7)	10.2 (50.4)	17.2 (63.0)	19.6 (67.3)	16.5 (61.7)	9.0 (48.2)	−2.0 (28.4)	−17.9 (−0.2)	−27.4 (−17.3)	−3.0 (26.6)
Mean daily minimum °C (°F)	−34.1 (−29.4)	−31.4 (−24.5)	−21.0 (−5.8)	−6.3 (20.7)	2.2 (36.0)	9.4 (48.9)	13.5 (56.3)	11.1 (52.0)	3.1 (37.6)	−7.9 (17.8)	−23.9 (−11.0)	−32.8 (−27.0)	−9.8 (14.3)
Average precipitation mm (inches)	4.2 (0.17)	4.2 (0.17)	5.1 (0.20)	21.7 (0.85)	45.4 (1.79)	69.8 (2.75)	105.8 (4.17)	97.0 (3.82)	51.7 (2.04)	24.9 (0.98)	13.4 (0.53)	6.3 (0.25)	449.5 (17.72)
Average precipitation days (≥ 0.1 mm)	6.2	5.5	3.9	5.9	11.3	13.7	15.6	15.7	11.7	7.7	8.9	7.6	113.7
Average snowy days	7.4	6.2	4.3	4.5	0.3	0.1	0	0.1	0.7	6.7	10.3	9.4	50
Average relative humidity (%)	68	65	60	53	58	71	78	81	76	71	74	70	69
Mean monthly sunshine hours	148.7	182.0	254.0	254.7	235.2	264.2	234.8	213.2	186.1	163.5	139.5	120.7	2,396.6
Percentage possible sunshine	59	65	68	60	47	52	46	47	50	51	55	52	54
Source: China Meteorological Administration

== Administrative divisions ==
There are three administrative villages in Beiji: Beiji Village (Chinese: 北极村, the northernmost village in China and seat of government), Beihong Village (Chinese: 北红村), and Luoguhe Village (Chinese: 洛古河村).

== See also ==
- List of township-level divisions of Heilongjiang
