= Rock Paintings of Daxing'anling =

Prehistoric art

Petroglyphs of Daxing'anling
- Periods: Upper Paleolithic
- Location: Daxing'anling, Heilongjiang

Site notes
- Discovered: September 1974

Rock Paintings of Daxing'anling (simplified Chinese: 大兴安岭岩画; traditional Chinese: 大興安嶺岩畫; pinyin: Dàxīng'ānlǐng Yánhuà) are images carved into the rocks of the Daxing'anling Prefecture. Most of these petroglyphs are distributed in the depths of the mountains that are not easily accessible by human activities, and on the relatively protruding rock faces of the peaks.

Rock Paintings of Daxing'anling, dating back to about 10000 years ago, is a preliminary proof that Daxing'anling is the cradle of Heilongjiang and even the ancient civilization of China, and is the habitat of early human reproduction.

Rock Paintings of Daxing'anling shows the colorful life of ancient ancestors in the Daxing'anling and Heilongjiang Basin (黑龙江流域), and also reflects the early civilization form and primitive religious content in the Daxing'anling and Heilongjiang Basin.

== Discovery and research ==
Rock Paintings of Daxing'anling was first discovered and recorded in September 1974 by Zhao Zhencai (赵振才), then a researcher at the Institute of Cultural Relics and Archaeology of Hunan Province (黑龙江省文物考古研究所).

Some Chinese researchers believe that the Rock Paintings of Daxing'anling is an important node of the Pacific Rim Rock Art Belt (环太平洋岩画带), and its discovery has connected the rock art belt in northern China, providing new and vivid materials for the study of the formation of early ethnic groups and peoples and cultural changes in Northeast China.
