= Aydingkol =

Lake in Western China

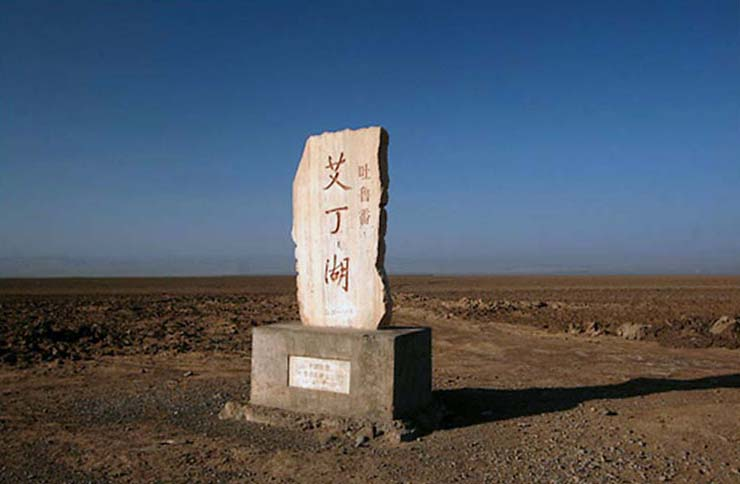
- Stele at Aydingkol

- Location within Bayingolin
- Location: Turfan Depression, Xinjiang
- Coordinates: 42°39′27″N 89°16′14″E
- Etymology: "Moon lake" in Uyghur
- Basin countries: China
- Surface elevation: −154 m (−505 ft)

Uyghur name
- Uyghur: ئايدىڭكۆل
Transcriptions
- Latin Yëziqi: Aydingköl
- Siril Yëziqi: Айдиңкөл

Chinese name
- Chinese: 艾丁湖
Transcriptions
Standard Mandarin
- Hanyu Pinyin: Àidīng Hú

Aydingkol (Uyghur: ئايدىڭكۆل, lit. 'moon lake'), or Aiding Lake (Chinese: 艾丁湖), is a lake in the Turpan Depression, located within Xinjiang, China. At 154 m below sea level, it is the lowest point in China. This lake is now totally dried, and very muddy and salty.

== History ==
In ancient times, Aydingkol was known as Jueluowan (Chinese: 觉洛浣; pinyin: Juéluòwǎn). The Uyghur-derived name Aydingköl means "moon lake", due to the lake having a layer of white salt along its edge, giving the appearance of a shining moon.

== Geography ==
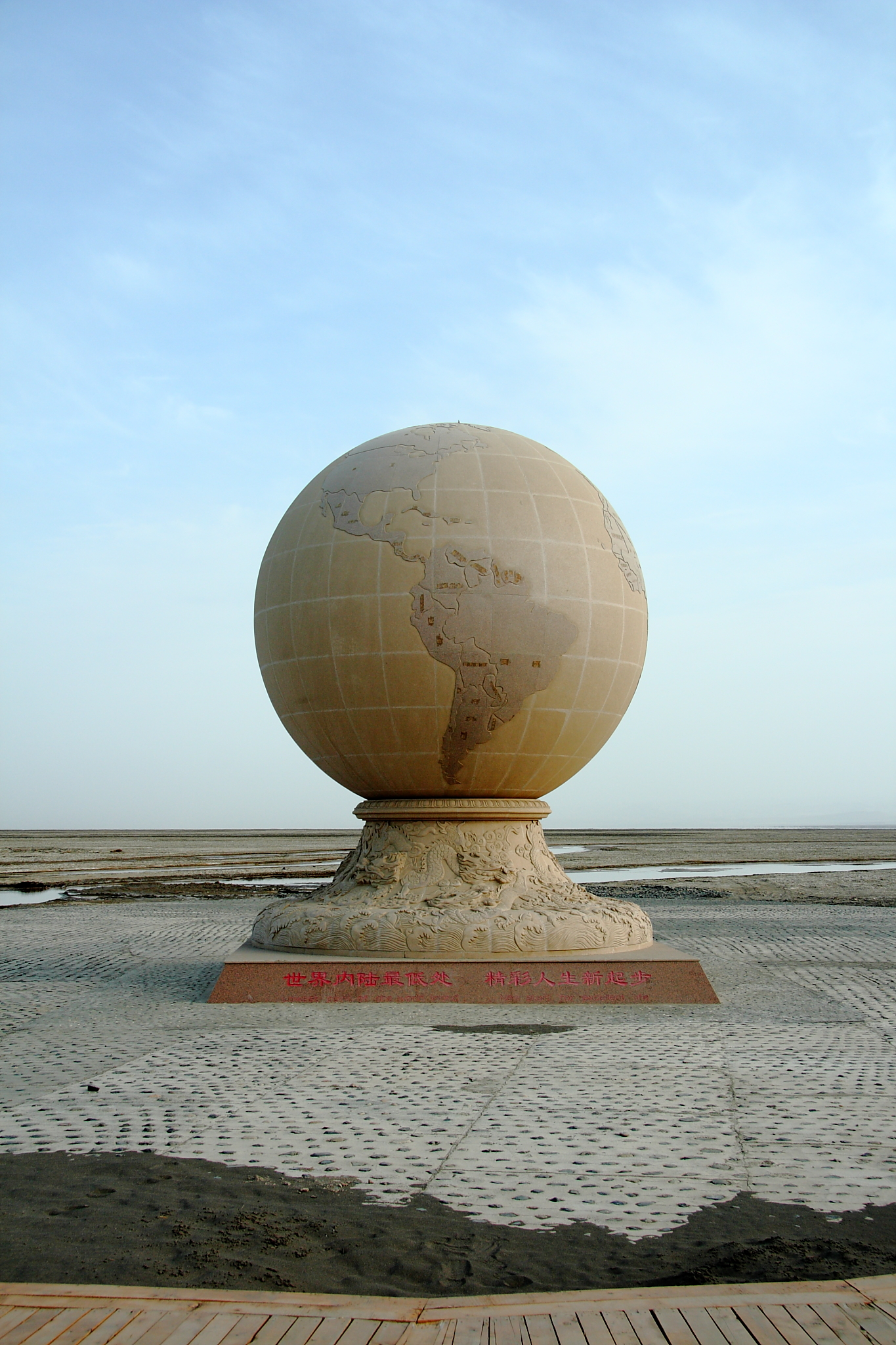
Monument marking the lowest elevation point in China

The lake is located in the south hinterland of the Turpan Depression, approximately 35 kilometres away from the city of Turpan. From east to west, the lake spans 40 kilometres; the north-south span is 8 kilometres; and the total area of the lake is 200 square kilometres. The lake was formed from the formation of an orogeny of the Himalayas 249 million years ago, and once held approximately 5 million square kilometres of inland sea, which at one time surged up and became vastly extended. During the winter of 1948, the lake basin was once filled with freshwater, which primarily originated from melted snow water from the mountains, as well as supplementary groundwater; owing to the lesser use of water to irrigate cultivated land during the winter, the water level was higher. During the summertime, the water level declined as a result of increased use of irrigation water for farming, as well as significant natural evaporation. Due to the expansion of farming in the region, the population using water from the lake subsequently increased, and by 1958 the lake only held up to 22 square kilometres, with a water depth of about 0.8 metres. As of 2000, except for the southwest region, little lakewater remained, and the entire lake area has become a saltpan, with the centre of the lake holding silt swamps, and no longer holds any native birds. During times of intense sunshine, mirages can often be seen.

Nowadays, Aydingkol has a salt mill, which uses the region's alum salt crystals and saltpeter raw materials to manufacture chemical products. Scenic tours also run near the lake.

On 24 July 2015, a new China-wide high temperature record was set at a meteorological station near Aydingkol, with a temperature of 50.3 °C (122.5 °F), a record it held until 17 July 2023 when Sanbao hit 52.2 °C (126 °F).

== See also ==
- List of extreme points of China
