= Oksalur =

Oksalur 吾合沙鲁乡 (Chinese) ئوقسالۇر يېزىسى (Uyghur) وقسالىر ايىلى (Kyrgyz) Wuheshalu
- Township
- Location of the township
- Coordinates: 39.6751364027°N 74.7914523316°E
- Country: People's Republic of China
- Autonomous region: Xinjiang
- Prefecture: Kizilsu
- County: Ulugqat (Wuqia)
- Seat: Qat Village (Qiati; 恰提村)
- Villages: 2

Area
  - Total: 1,317 km^{2} (508 sq mi)

Population (2017)
  - Total: 1,031
  - Density: 0.7828/km^{2} (2.028/sq mi)

Ethnic groups
  - Major ethnic groups: Kyrgyz
- Time zone: UTC+8 (China Standard Time)
- Website: www.xjwqx.gov.cn/sitemap.htm

Oksalur Township (ئوقسالۇر يېزىسى / Wuheshalu, Chinese: 吾合沙鲁乡; pinyin: Wúhéshālǔ Xiāng) is a township of Ulugqat County (Wuqia) in Kizilsu Kyrgyz Autonomous Prefecture, Xinjiang Uygur Autonomous Region, China. Located in the southwest of the county, the township covers an area of 1,745.5 square kilometers with a population of 1,031 (as of 2017). It has 2 villages under its jurisdiction. Its seat is at Qat Village (恰提村).

Oksalur Township is located 35 kilometers west of the county seat Wuqia Town. It is adjacent to Kiziloy Township in the east, Boritokay Township in the south and Ulugqat Township in the northwest, and borders with the Kyrgyz Republic in the west with a boundary line of 7 kilometers. There are 2 mountain passes and a river connecting with Kyrgyzstan.

== Name ==
The word Oksalur (ئوقسالۇر) comes from the Kyrgyz language, which means 'bullets in the chamber (of a gun)' or 'bullet in the bore (of a gun)'- Ok (ئوق), transliterated into Chinese characters as Wuhe (吾合) means 'bullet'. According to local tradition, there were numerous battles in this place, and the commanders ordered the locals' guns to be loaded with bullets. The name Oksalur is transliterated into Chinese characters as Wuheshalu (吾合沙鲁). In Qing Dynasty maps of Shufu County, Oksalur is transliterated into Chinese characters as Wohusulu (倭胡素魯).

== History ==
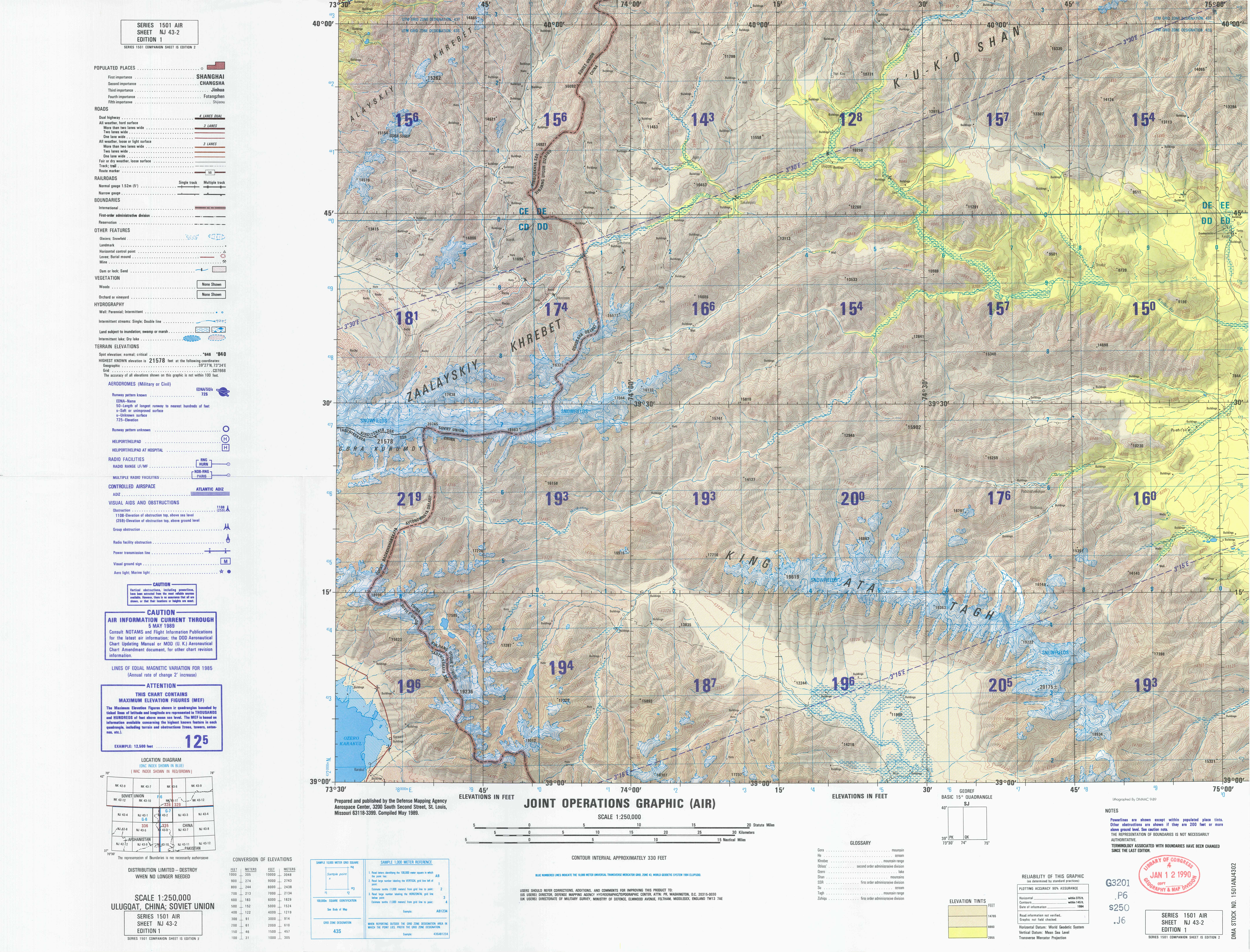
Map including Oksalur (labeled as Ohsalur) (above 15⁰) (DMA, 1989)

Oksalur was part of the 2nd district of Wuqia County in 1950. Oksalur Commune (吾合沙鲁公社) was formed in 1958. In 1968 during the Cultural Revolution, the commune was renamed Weidong Commune (卫东公社). The original name was restored in 1980, and the commune was reorganized as a township in 1984.

In early 2017, a security checkpoint was set up outside the door of the Oksalur Township border guard office.

== Geography ==
Oksalur is located on the northern bank of the Kezi River 35 km (22 mi) southwest of the county seat. There is a scrubland along the Kezi River including many sea buckthorn.

== Settlements ==
The township has 2 administrative villages and 3 unincorporated villages under its jurisdiction.

- Chat Village (Qiaticun) (恰提村, چات كەنتى, چات قىشتاعى)
  - meaning 'fork in the road' or 'junction' (岔口)
- Oqsalur Village (Wuheshalucun) (吾合沙鲁村, ئوقسالۇر كەنتى, وقسالىر قىشتاعى)
  - Maraltoqay (玛拉勒托阔依, مارال توقاي, مارال توقوي)

== Demographics ==
Historical population
Year	Pop.	±% p.a.
2000	1,355	—
2010	1,029	−2.71%

As of 1997, the population of Kiziloy was 98% Kyrgyz.

== Economy ==
The economy of Oksalur is based on agriculture and animal husbandry.

== Transportation ==
Public roads to the north connect Oksalur to the road between Ulugqat Township and Artux.
