= Bizhou, Heilongjiang =

Bizhou 碧洲镇
- Town
- Location in Heilongjiang Bizhou (China)
- Coordinates: 51°56′37″N 124°36′00″E
- Country: People's Republic of China
- Province: Heilongjiang
- Prefecture: Da Hinggan Ling
- County: Xinlin
- Village-level divisions: 1 residential community
- Elevation: 439 m (1,440 ft)
- Time zone: UTC+8 (China Standard)
- Area code: 0457

Bizhou (Chinese: 碧洲; pinyin: Bìzhōu) is a town of Xinlin District in the south-central part of Da Hinggan Ling Prefecture, Heilongjiang province, China, located 40 kilometres (25 mi) south of the prefectural seat. As of 2013, it has one residential community (社区) under its administration.

== See also ==
- List of township-level divisions of Heilongjiang
