= Xinlin District =

Xinlin 新林(行政)区
- Administrative Zone
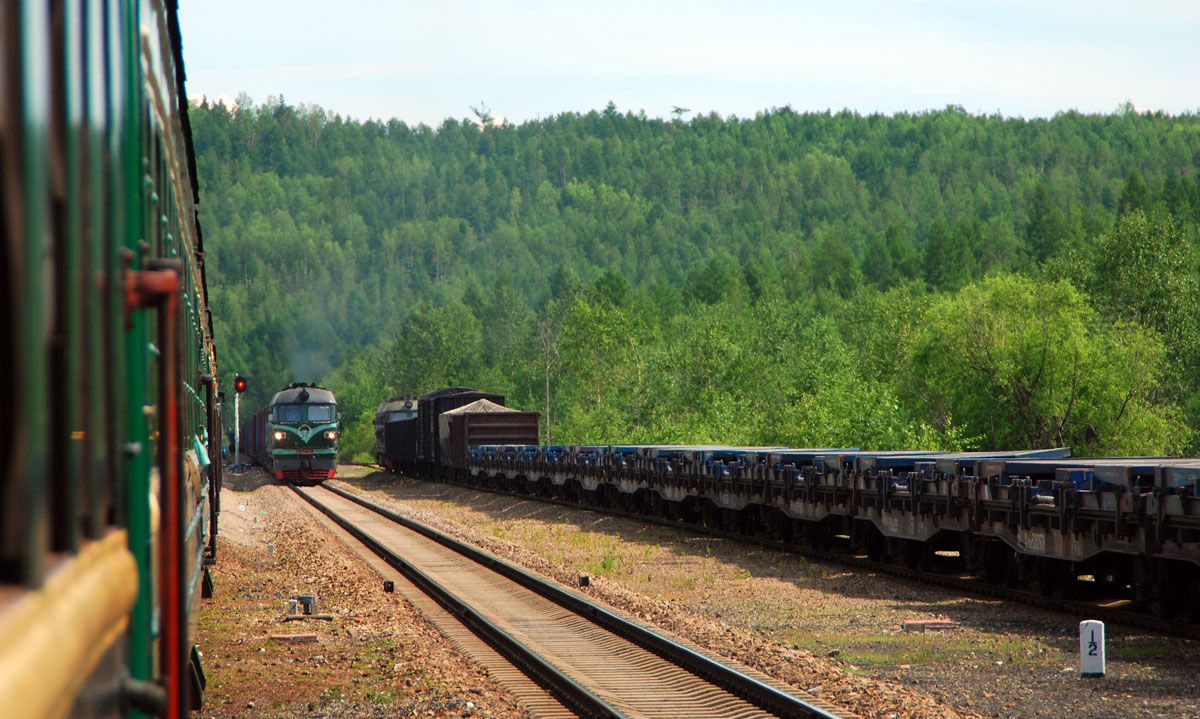

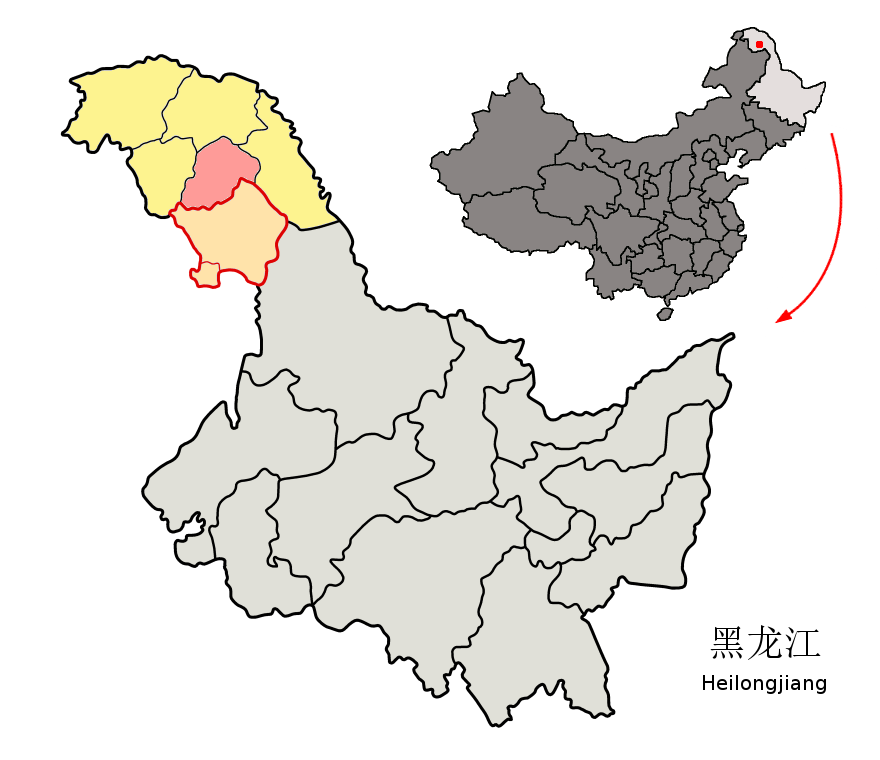
- Location of the district (red) in Daxing'anling (yellow) and Heilongjiang

- Location in Heilongjiang
- Coordinates: 51°40′26″N 124°23′42″E
- Country: China
- Province: Heilongjiang
- Prefecture: Daxing'anling
- District seat: Xinlin

Area
  - Total: 8,700 km^{2} (3,400 sq mi)

Population (2020 census)
  - Total: 20,362
  - Density: 2.3/km^{2} (6.1/sq mi)
- Time zone: UTC+8 (China Standard)
- Website: www.dxalxl.gov.cn

Xinlin (Chinese: 新林区; pinyin: Xīnlín Qū) is a de facto district of Daxing'anling Prefecture, Heilongjiang province, China. Xinlin District is not an official administrative entity; it is de jure under the jurisdiction of Huma County.

== Administrative divisions ==
Xinlin District is divided into 7 towns.

7 towns

- Xinlin (新林镇)
- Cuigang (翠岗镇)
- Tayuan (塔源镇)
- Dawusu (大乌苏镇)
- Ta'ergen (塔尔根镇)
- Bizhou (碧洲镇)
- Hongtu (宏图镇)

== Climate ==
Climate data for Xinlin, elevation 502 m (1,647 ft), (1991–2020 normals, extremes 1981–2010)
Month	Jan	Feb	Mar	Apr	May	Jun	Jul	Aug	Sep	Oct	Nov	Dec	Year
Record high °C (°F)	1.0 (33.8)	7.1 (44.8)	17.2 (63.0)	26.4 (79.5)	35.0 (95.0)	40.1 (104.2)	37.9 (100.2)	36.6 (97.9)	31.6 (88.9)	25.9 (78.6)	11.2 (52.2)	1.6 (34.9)	40.1 (104.2)
Mean daily maximum °C (°F)	−15.4 (4.3)	−9.5 (14.9)	−1.7 (28.9)	8.6 (47.5)	17.6 (63.7)	23.8 (74.8)	25.8 (78.4)	23.5 (74.3)	17.0 (62.6)	6.7 (44.1)	−6.9 (19.6)	−16.0 (3.2)	6.1 (43.0)
Daily mean °C (°F)	−24.9 (−12.8)	−20.4 (−4.7)	−10.6 (12.9)	1.4 (34.5)	9.7 (49.5)	15.8 (60.4)	18.5 (65.3)	15.9 (60.6)	8.6 (47.5)	−1.0 (30.2)	−15.2 (4.6)	−24.1 (−11.4)	−2.2 (28.1)
Mean daily minimum °C (°F)	−31.5 (−24.7)	−28.7 (−19.7)	−19.4 (−2.9)	−6.1 (21.0)	1.3 (34.3)	7.8 (46.0)	12.3 (54.1)	9.9 (49.8)	1.9 (35.4)	−7.4 (18.7)	−21.6 (−6.9)	−30.1 (−22.2)	−9.3 (15.2)
Record low °C (°F)	−48.3 (−54.9)	−43.4 (−46.1)	−36.2 (−33.2)	−23.2 (−9.8)	−10.2 (13.6)	−2.8 (27.0)	0.8 (33.4)	0.0 (32.0)	−8.9 (16.0)	−26.2 (−15.2)	−37.2 (−35.0)	−42.9 (−45.2)	−48.3 (−54.9)
Average precipitation mm (inches)	4.8 (0.19)	3.6 (0.14)	7.9 (0.31)	18.5 (0.73)	54.7 (2.15)	95.8 (3.77)	140.9 (5.55)	107.8 (4.24)	61.8 (2.43)	21.6 (0.85)	9.8 (0.39)	6.6 (0.26)	533.8 (21.01)
Average precipitation days (≥ 0.1 mm)	8.1	5.5	5.9	8.0	12.1	15.8	18.3	15.1	11.9	7.7	7.8	8.3	124.5
Average snowy days	11.6	8.6	9.9	10.3	2.2	0.2	0	0	1.4	9.6	12.4	12.5	78.7
Average relative humidity (%)	68	63	57	52	55	71	79	81	73	64	69	70	67
Mean monthly sunshine hours	164.2	203.0	261.5	247.0	241.5	231.0	208.0	203.4	195.3	187.1	160.3	139.4	2,441.7
Percentage possible sunshine	63	72	70	59	50	47	42	46	52	58	62	58	57
Source: China Meteorological Administration
