= Ulugqat Township =

Ulugqat: 乌鲁克恰提乡 (Chinese); ئۇلۇغچات يېزىسى (Uyghur); كۅنۅۅ ۇلۇۇچات ايىلى (Kyrgyz); Wulukeqiati
- Township
- Location of the township
- Coordinates: 39.8208959772°N 74.3398508697°E
- Country: People's Republic of China
- Autonomous region: Xinjiang
- Prefecture: Kizilsu
- County: Ulugqat (Wuqia)

Area
  - Total: 3,430 km^{2} (1,320 sq mi)

Population (2017)
  - Total: 4,430

Ethnic groups
  - Major ethnic groups: Kyrgyz
- Time zone: UTC+8 (China Standard Time)
- Website: www.xjwqx.gov.cn/sitemap.htm

Ulugqat Township (Chinese: 乌鲁克恰提乡; pinyin: Wūlǔkèqiàtí Xiāng) is a township of Ulugqat County (Wuqia) in Kizilsu Kyrgyz Autonomous Prefecture, Xinjiang Uygur Autonomous Region, China. Located in the middle north of the county, the township covers an area of 3,430 square kilometers with a population of 4,430 (as of 2017). It has 4 villages under its jurisdiction. Its seat is at Korgan Village (库尔干村).

Ulugqat Township is located 92 kilometers west of the county seat Wuqia Town. It is adjacent to Kiziloy Township in the east, Oksalur Township in the south and Jigin Township in the west, and borders with the Kyrgyz Republic in the north with a boundary line of 118 kilometers. There are 9 mountain passes connecting Kyrgyzstan.

== Name ==
The name of Ulugqat is from the Kyrgyz language, meaning branch valleys (山沟分岔口). It is named after that the Kizilsu Valley divides into two separate branch valleys in the area and the place presents the shape of the three mountain valleys.

== History ==
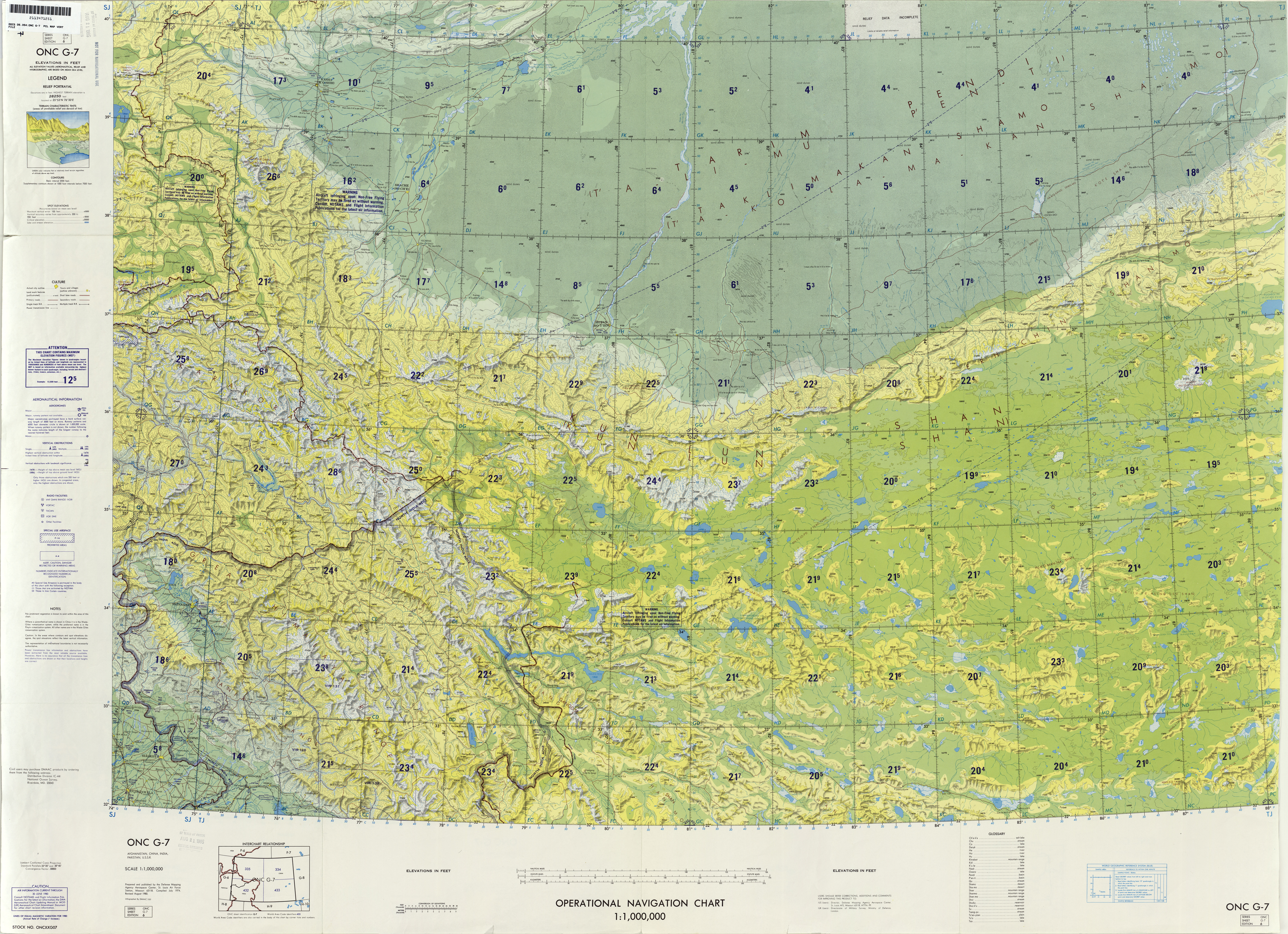
Map including Ulugqat (Wu-lu-k'o-ch'ia-t'i) (DMA, 1980)

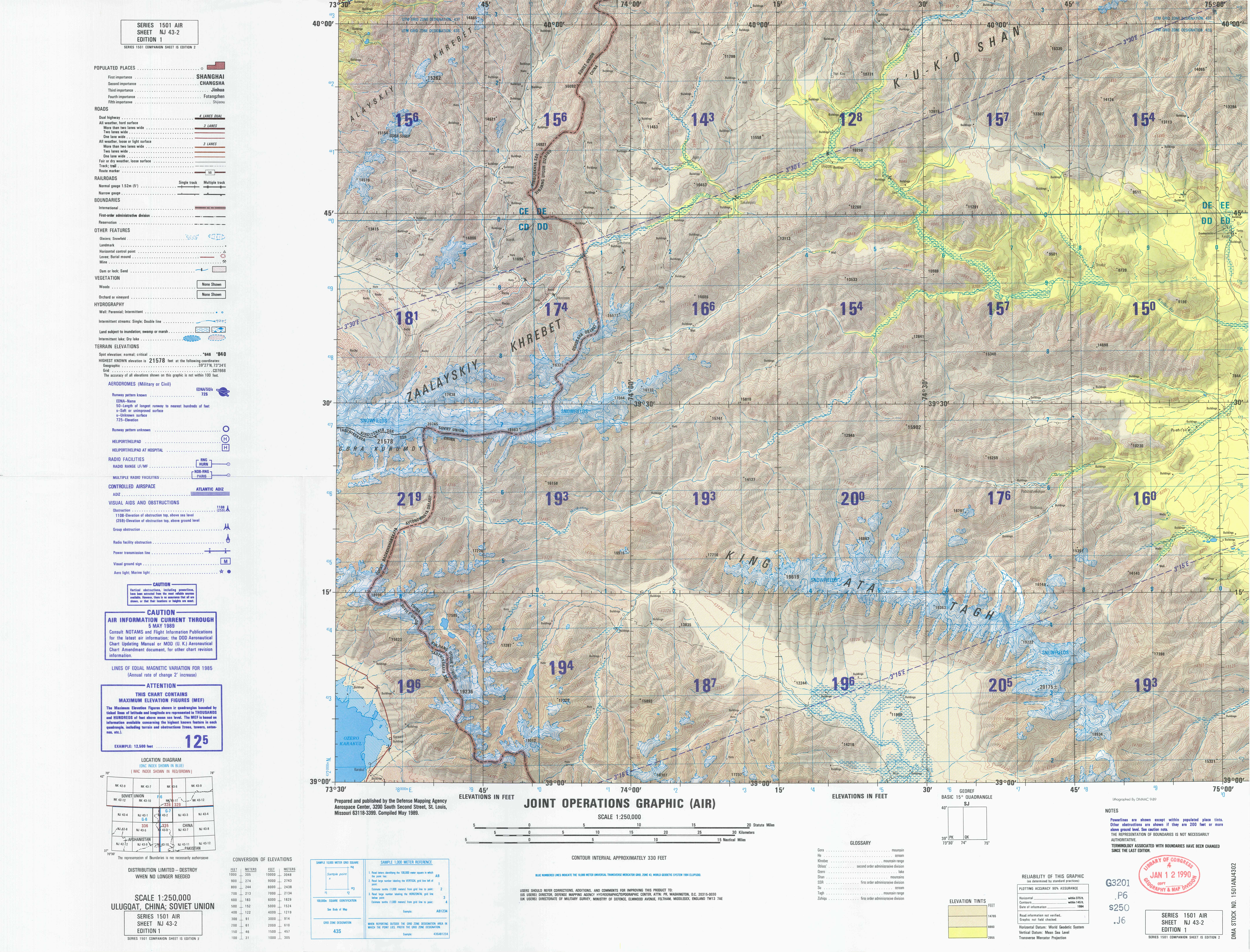
Map including Ulugqat (near 12^{8}) (DMA, 1989)

Ulugqat Township is commonly known as old Wuqia. Ulugqat Township was once the seat of Ulugqat branch county (乌鲁克恰提分县) established from Shufu County in 1913. Ulugqat branch county was changed to Ulugqat Division (乌鲁克恰提设治局) in 1929 and the county of Wuqia was established from Ulugqat Division in 1938 and the county seat was transferred to Wuqia Town.

Ulugqat was part of the 2nd district of Wuqia County in 1950. Ulugqat Commune (乌鲁克恰提公社) was formed in 1958. The commune was renamed to Dongfeng Commune (东风公社) in 1968 and restored the former name in 1980. The commune was reorganized as a township in 1984.

On May 6, 2020 at 6:51 PM (Beijing Time), a 5.0 magnitude earthquake struck 25 km (16 mi) west of Ulugqat. (39.71°N 74.1°E)

== Subdivisions ==
The township has 4 villages and 8 unincorporated villages under its jurisdiction.

- Qizilkowruk Village (Kezilekulucun) (克孜勒库鲁村, قىزىل كۆۋرۈك كەنتى, قىزىل كۅپۉرۅ قىشتاعى)
- Qorghan Village (Ku'ergancun) (库尔干村, قورغان كەنتى, قورغون قىشتاعى)
  - 39°49′17″N 074°20′20″E
- Chongterek Village (Qiongtierekecun) (琼铁热克村, چوڭتېرەك كەنتى, چوڭتەرەك قىشتاعى)
  - 39°57′19″N 074°27′39″E
- Saryqbai Village (Sarekebayicun) (萨热克巴依村, سېرىقباي كەنتى, سارىقباي قىشتاعى)
  - 40°00′55″N 074°34′12″E

== Demographics ==
Historical population
| Year | Pop. | ±% p.a. |
|---|---|---|
| 2000 | 3,477 | — |
| 2010 | 3,951 | +1.29% |

As of 1997, the population of Ulugqat was mostly of Kyrgyz ethnicity.

== Economy ==
Ulugqat's economy is primarily based on animal husbandry.

Protected animals in Ulugqat include argali, goitered gazelle, and snowcock.
