= Mohe City =

Mohe 漠河市
- County-level city
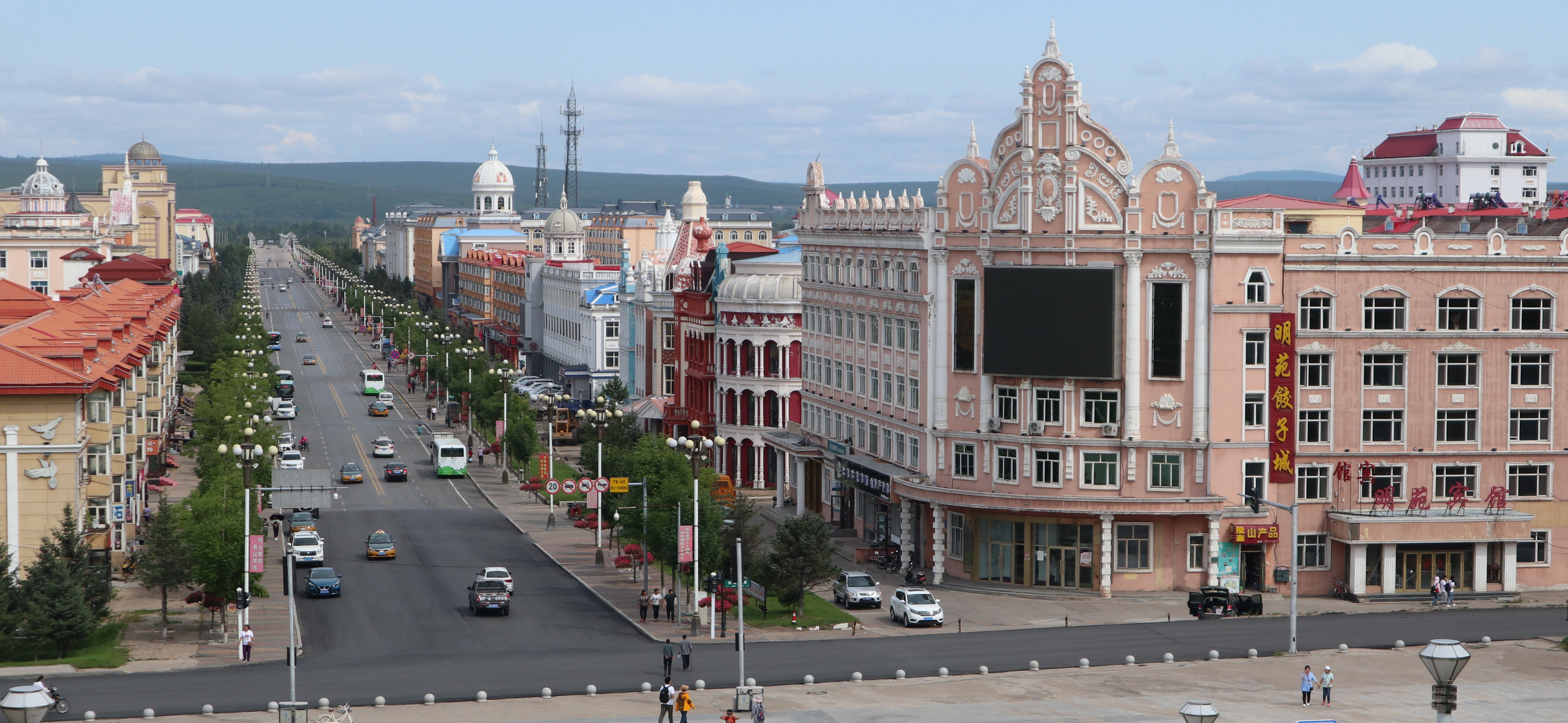
- Mohe City skyline (2019)

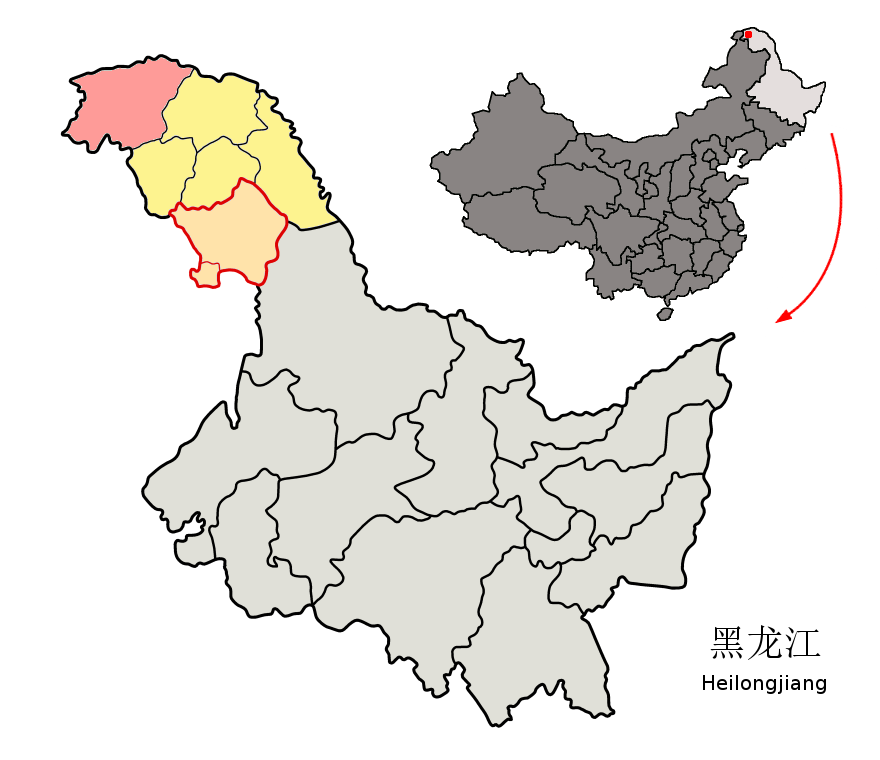
- Location of Mohe City jurisdiction (pink) in Daxing'anling Prefecture (yellow) and Heilongjiang

- Location of the city center in Heilongjiang Mohe (China)
- Coordinates: 52°58′19″N 122°32′20″E
- Country: China
- Province: Heilongjiang
- Prefecture: Daxing'anling
- Municipal seat: Xilinji

Area
  - Total: 18,233 km^{2} (7,040 sq mi)
- Elevation: 435 m (1,427 ft)

Population (2020 census)
  - Total: 54,036
  - Density: 2.9636/km^{2} (7.6758/sq mi)
- Time zone: UTC+8 (China Standard)
- Postal code: 165300
- Website: www.mohe.gov.cn

Mohe City
- Chinese: 漠河
- Literal meaning: "Desert River"
Transcriptions
Standard Mandarin
- Hanyu Pinyin: Mòhé
- Bopomofo: ㄇㄛˋ ㄏㄜˊ
- Gwoyeu Romatzyh: Mohher

Mohe (Chinese: 漠河; pinyin: Mòhé) is a county-level city in Daxing'anling Prefecture, Heilongjiang province. It is the northernmost city in China. As of the 2020 Chinese Census, it has a population of 54,036.

== Administrative divisions ==
Mohe City is divided into 6 towns.

Name	Hanzi	Population (2020)
Xilinji	西林吉镇	29,614
Tuqiang	图强镇	10,402
Amu'er	阿木尔镇	9,115
Xing'an	兴安镇	992
Beiji	北极镇	2,373
Gulian	古莲镇	1,540

== Geography ==
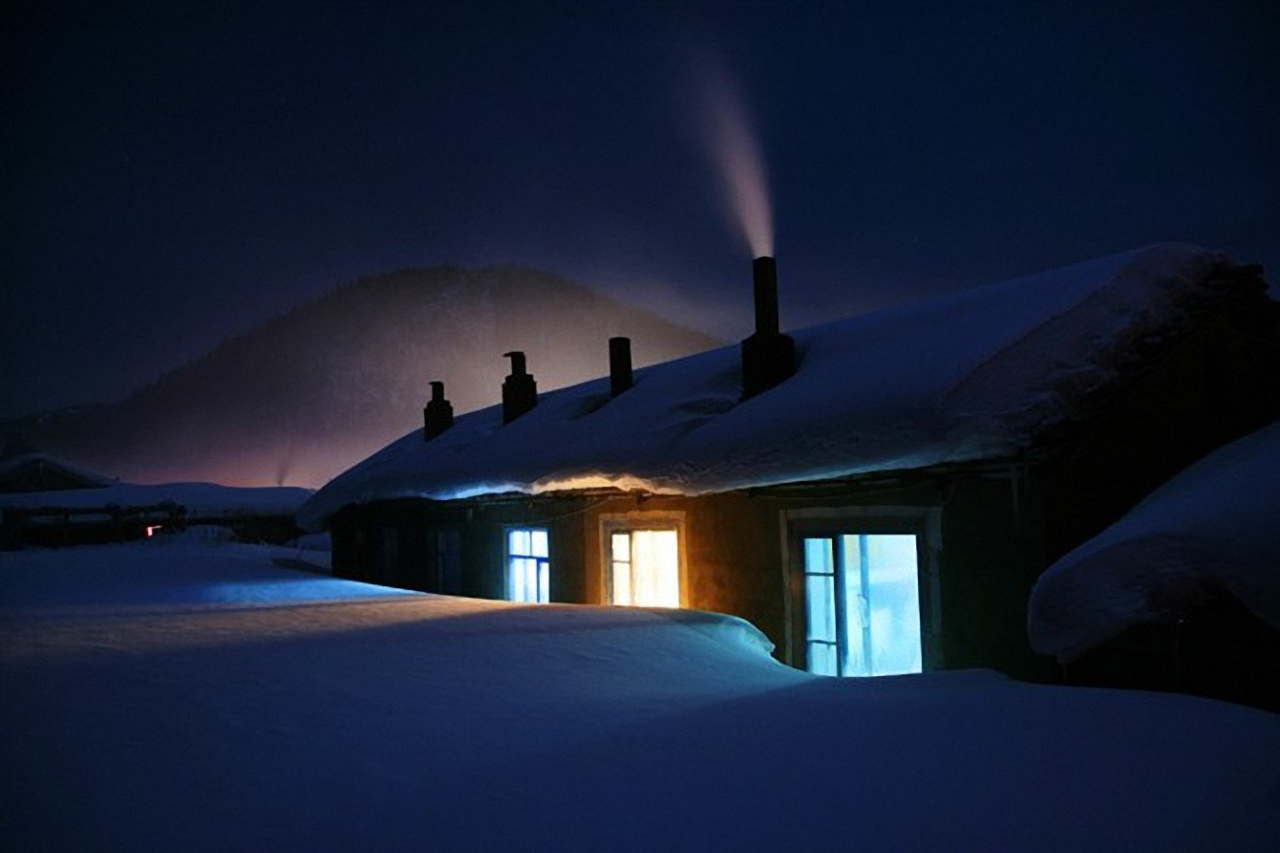
Night in Beiji Village

Mohe is located in the far northwest of Heilongjiang at latitude 52° 10'−53° 33' N and 121° 07'−124° 20' E. It forms a border with Russia's Amur Oblast and Zabaykalsky Krai, where the Amur River flows for 245 kilometres (152 mi). A village, the northernmost Chinese settlement, at the latitude of 53° 29' N and known as the Beiji Village (北极村, literally "North Pole Village" or "Northernmost Village"), lies in this city, on the Amur River.

On extremely rare occasions, the aurora borealis can be seen.

Mohe spans 150 kilometres (93 mi) from north to south and has a total area of 18,233 square kilometres (7,040 sq mi), occupying 21.6% of the prefecture's (Daxing'anling) area and 3.9% of the provincial (Heilongjiang) area. This creates a population density of only 4.64 persons/km^{2} (12.0 persons/sqmi).

=== Maps ===
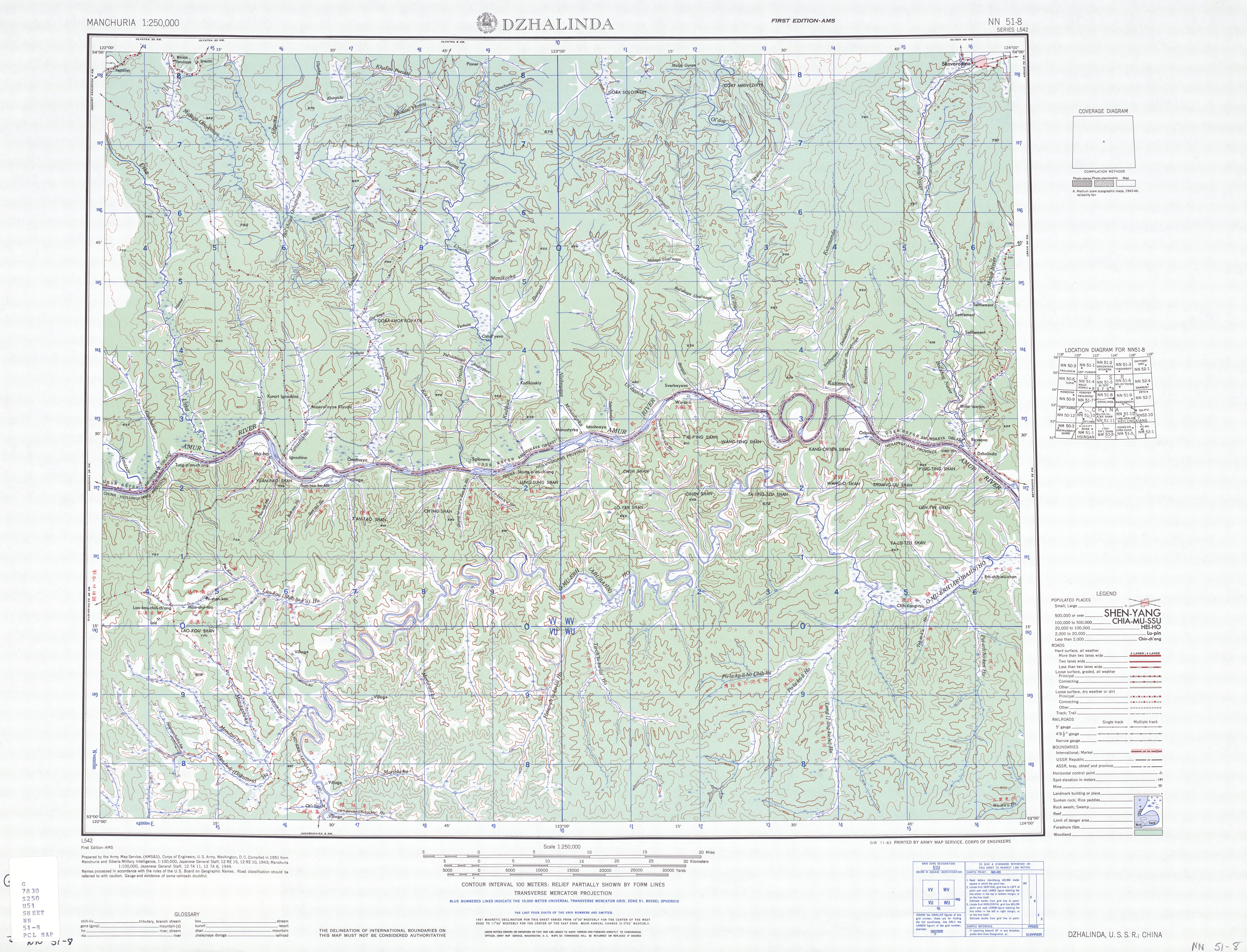
Dzhalinda (1951)

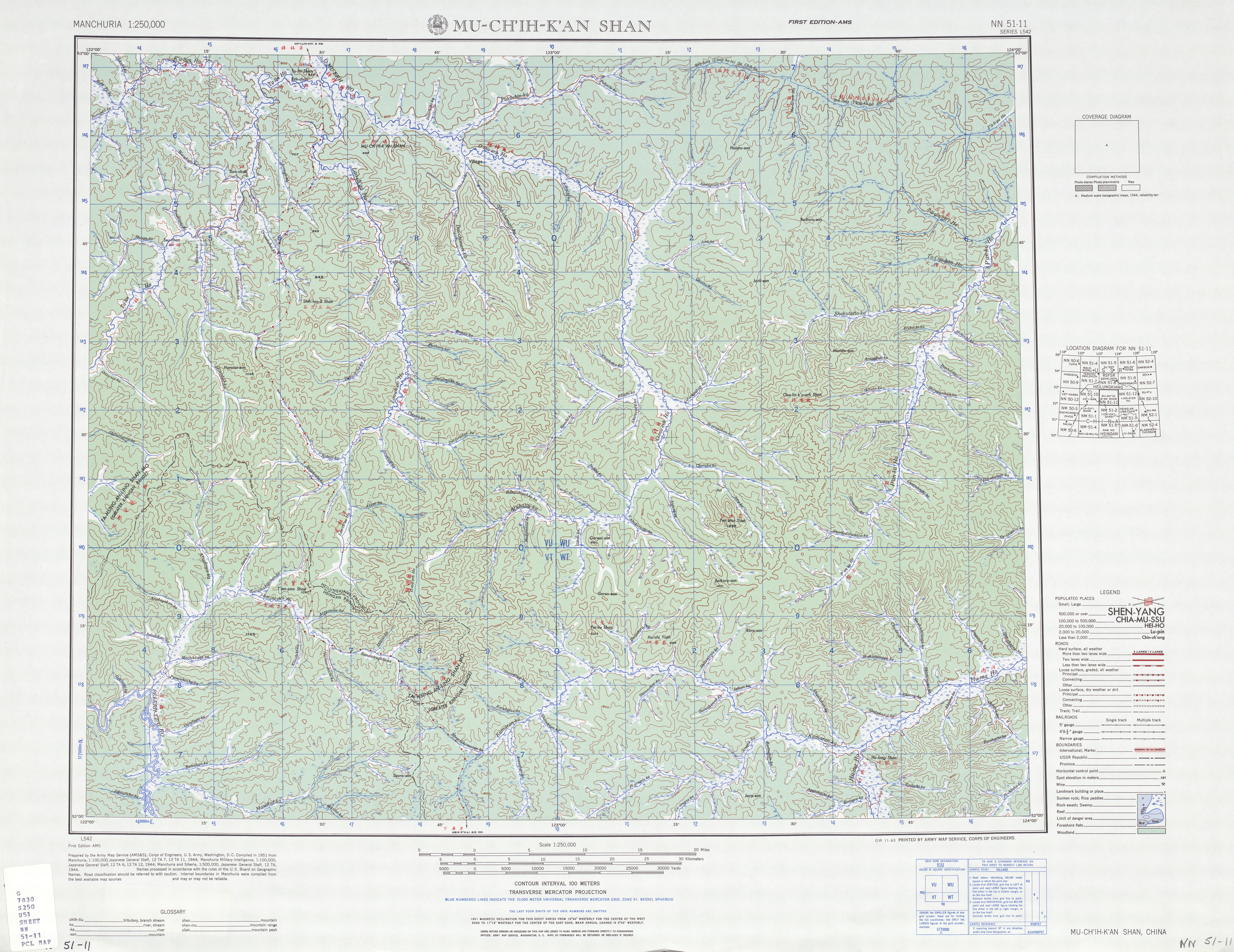
Map including part of Mohe (AMS, 1951)

== Climate ==
Mohe, by virtue of its far northern location and proximity to Siberia, is one of the few locations in China with a subarctic climate (Köppen Dwc, Trewartha Ecbd), closely bordering on extreme humid continental, with long, dry, severe winters, and short, warm, wet summers. Winter begins in early to mid-October and lasts until late April or early May, and temperatures then are normally the coldest nationwide. Average temperatures stay below freezing for a total of nearly seven months of the year, and the frost-free period is just short of 90 days; in addition, the diurnal temperature variation is large, averaging 17.2 °C (31.0 °F) annually. The monthly 24-hour average temperature ranges from −27.9 °C (−18.2 °F) in January to 18.6 °C (65.5 °F) in July, with an annual mean of −3.6 °C (25.5 °F), so that the city is only a little south of the line of continuous permafrost. Extreme temperatures have ranged from −53.0 °C (−63.4 °F) to 39.3 °C (102.7 °F). The record low temperature of −53.0 °C (−63.4 °F), registered on 22 January 2023, was also the lowest temperature recorded in China. December and January have never recorded an above-freezing temperature, and all 12 months have had sub-freezing temperatures at some point.

Climate data for Mohe, elevation 433 m (1,421 ft), (1991–2020 normals, extremes 1951–present)
Month	Jan	Feb	Mar	Apr	May	Jun	Jul	Aug	Sep	Oct	Nov	Dec	Year
Record high °C (°F)	−4.6 (23.7)	5.5 (41.9)	17.6 (63.7)	30.9 (87.6)	35.1 (95.2)	39.3 (102.7)	38.0 (100.4)	35.5 (95.9)	32.4 (90.3)	25.3 (77.5)	10.3 (50.5)	−3 (27)	39.3 (102.7)
Mean daily maximum °C (°F)	−18.0 (−0.4)	−11.1 (12.0)	−1.9 (28.6)	8.7 (47.7)	17.7 (63.9)	24.7 (76.5)	26.3 (79.3)	23.6 (74.5)	17.1 (62.8)	5.5 (41.9)	−8.7 (16.3)	−18.7 (−1.7)	5.4 (41.8)
Daily mean °C (°F)	−27.9 (−18.2)	−23.3 (−9.9)	−12.2 (10.0)	0.8 (33.4)	9.3 (48.7)	15.9 (60.6)	18.6 (65.5)	15.4 (59.7)	7.9 (46.2)	−2.6 (27.3)	−17.4 (0.7)	−27.1 (−16.8)	−3.6 (25.6)
Mean daily minimum °C (°F)	−34.9 (−30.8)	−32.3 (−26.1)	−22.0 (−7.6)	−7.6 (18.3)	0.2 (32.4)	6.4 (43.5)	11.1 (52.0)	8.5 (47.3)	0.5 (32.9)	−9.4 (15.1)	−24.2 (−11.6)	−33.3 (−27.9)	−11.4 (11.5)
Record low °C (°F)	−53.0 (−63.4)	−52.3 (−62.1)	−44 (−47)	−32.6 (−26.7)	−14.1 (6.6)	−5.5 (22.1)	−1.4 (29.5)	−4.4 (24.1)	−13.7 (7.3)	−29.5 (−21.1)	−47.4 (−53.3)	−50.9 (−59.6)	−53.0 (−63.4)
Average precipitation mm (inches)	6.7 (0.26)	4.4 (0.17)	6.2 (0.24)	18.4 (0.72)	44.4 (1.75)	60.1 (2.37)	117.0 (4.61)	99.4 (3.91)	52.3 (2.06)	27.7 (1.09)	13.1 (0.52)	8.1 (0.32)	457.8 (18.02)
Average precipitation days (≥ 0.1 mm)	8.1	6.2	5.2	7.0	11.5	13.3	16.5	14.8	11.8	9.9	9.9	9.7	123.9
Average snowy days	9.4	8.1	6.5	7.2	1.0	0.2	0	0.1	1.3	9.1	11.7	11.4	66
Average relative humidity (%)	68	65	61	54	57	70	78	81	75	69	72	70	68
Mean monthly sunshine hours	144.2	189.4	255.6	248.4	241.4	268.0	225.3	222.0	200.9	173.9	150.8	125.1	2,445
Percentage possible sunshine	56	67	69	59	49	53	45	49	54	54	59	53	56
Source 1: China Meteorological Administration
Source 2: Weather China

== Demographics ==
As of the 2020 Chinese Census, Mohe has a population of 54,036. Per the census, members of 18 different ethnic groups live in Mohe, including the Han, the Manchu, Mongols, Koreans, the Sibe, the Oroqen, Evenks, and Russians.

== Transportation ==
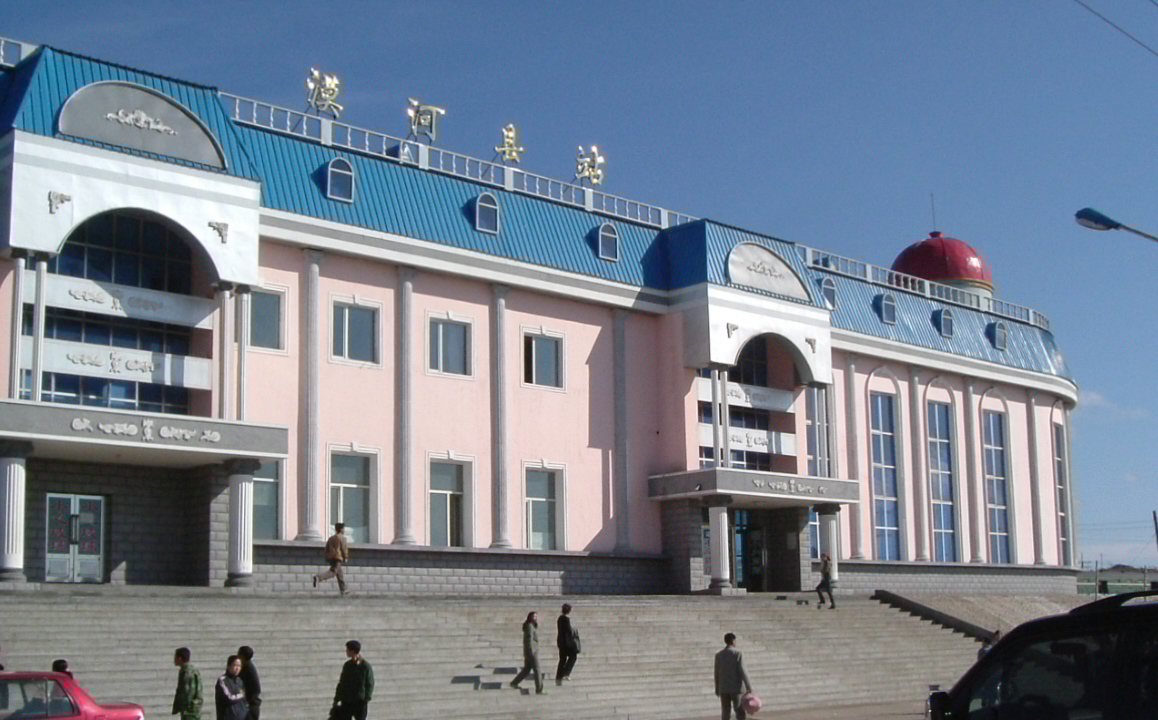
Mohe Railway Station

Mohe railway station, opened in 1972, is the northernmost railway station in China. It has regular passenger service to Harbin, Qiqihar, and Shenyang.

Mohe Gulian Airport, opened in 2008, is the nation's northernmost airport and the first Chinese airport built on permafrost.

== Notable people ==
- Chi Zijian

== In popular culture ==
- Mohe is the destination of both the main character and his fictional hero in Xiaolu Guo's film How Is Your Fish Today? (Jin tian de yu zen me yang?) (2006).
- Mohe Dance Hall 漠河舞厅 was destroyed by a major forest-fire on 6 May 1987 which killed 211 people and injured another 266 people. The dance hall was subsequently rebuilt, and is immortalised in the popular song Mohe Dance Hall, written and sung by Liu Shuang 柳爽, which was a viral hit in 2020, with over 2.3 billion views. It tells the story of a widower dancing alone after losing his wife in the fire. Liu dedicates the song to Zhang Dequan, whom he met when Zhang was dancing alone in the Mohe Dance Hall in 2019.

== See also ==
- List of extreme points of China
