= Boritokay =

Boritokay 膘尔托阔依乡 (Chinese) بۆرىتوقاي يېزىسى (Uyghur) بۅرۉتوقوي ايىلى (Kyrgyz) Biao'ertuokuoyi
- Township
- Location of the township
- Coordinates: 39.3230238805°N 75.0857422029°E
- Country: People's Republic of China
- Autonomous region: Xinjiang
- Prefecture: Kizilsu
- County: Wuqia

Area
  - Total: 4,221.2 km^{2} (1,629.8 sq mi)

Population (2017)
  - Total: 6,977

Ethnic groups
  - Major ethnic groups: Kyrgyz
- Time zone: UTC+8 (China Standard Time)
- Website: www.xjwqx.gov.cn/sitemap.htm

Boritokay Township (بۆرىتوقاي يېزىسى / Chinese: 膘尔托阔依乡; pinyin: Biāo'ěrtuōkuòyī Xiāng) is a township of Wuqia County in Kizilsu Kyrgyz Autonomous Prefecture, Xinjiang Uygur Autonomous Region, China. Located in the south of the county, the township covers an area of 4,221 square kilometers (1,630 sq mi) with a population of 6,977 (as of 2017). It has 5 villages under its jurisdiction. Its seat is at Dongengiz (墩艾额孜).

Boritokay Township is located 86 kilometers south of the county seat Wuqia Town. It is adjacent to Shufu County in the east, Bostanterak Township in the south, Akto County in the southwest, and Oksalur Township in the north.

== Name ==
The name "Boritokay" is from the Kyrgyz language. The word "bori" (膘尔) means wolf and the word "tokay" (托阔依) means forest, brush or grassy area. According to legend, there was a forest/grassland/brushland in Boritokay in which wolves roamed and hence the area was called Boritokay, meaning "forest/grassland/brushland with wolves in it". Xinjiang Tuzhi (新疆图志) mentions a Biaolituohai (标里托海) in the western part of Shufu, in the area of Boritokay.

== History ==
Boritokay was the 5th township of the 3rd district in Wuqia County in 1950. It was part of Bostanterak Commune (波斯坦铁列克公社) in 1958 and Boritokay Commune (膘尔托阔依公社) was formed from Bostanterak Commune in 1962, it was renamed Jinsong Commune (劲松公社) in 1968 and restored the original name in 1980, and organized as a township in 1984.

== Geography ==
Boritokay is 44 km (27 mi) south of the county seat. The township is located between 1,700 meters and 2,800 meters above sea level, most of which are mountainous areas.

== Settlements ==
The township has 5 administration villages and 21 unincorporated villages under its jurisdiction.

5 administration villages:

- Aqchi Village (Aheqicun) (阿合奇村, ئاقچى كەنتى, اقچىي قىشتاعى)
- Ayghart Village (Ayiga'ertecun) (阿依尕尔特村, ئايغارت كەنتى, ايعارت قىشتاعى)
  - 39°24′29″N 074°43′18″E
- Boritoqay Village (Biao'ertuokuoyicun) (膘尔托阔依村, بۆرىتوقاي كەنتى, بۅرۉتوقوي قىشتاعى)
  - also named Dong'engiz, (Dun'ai'ezicun) (墩艾额孜村, دۆڭئېڭىز كەنتى, دۅڭەڭئز قىشتاعى)
- Saz Village (Sazicun) (萨孜村, ساز كەنتى, ساز قىشتاعى)
- Targhalaq Village (Ta'ergalakecun) (塔尔尕拉克村, تارغالاق كەنتى, تارعالاق قىشتاعى)

== Economy ==
It is a township of semi-agriculture and semi-animal husbandry. Local wildlife include Argali, wolves, snow chicken, stone chicken, yellow sheep and so on. Ginseng and angelica grow in the area. Mineral resources include gold, copper, fossil oil and so on. The township has an area of 469.7 hectares of arable land, 355.7 hectares of forest land and 1,677 hectares of natural grassland. All the 5 villages in the township pass through the asphalt road, and mobile communication covers all the villages. There are 2 primary schools, 4 kindergartens, 1 health center, 5 clinics and 29 medical staff in the township.
