= Bostanterak =

Bostanterak 波斯坦铁列克乡 (Chinese) بوستانتېرەك يېزىسى (Uyghur) بوستونتەرەك ايىلى (Kyrgyz) Bositantielieke
- Township
- Location of the township
- Coordinates: 39.25120998°N 75.0839466497°E
- Country: People's Republic of China
- Autonomous region: Xinjiang
- Prefecture: Kizilsu
- County: Wuqia

Area
  - Total: 2,902 km^{2} (1,120 sq mi)

Population (2017)
  - Total: 9,725
- Time zone: UTC+8 (China Standard Time)
- Website: www.xjwqx.gov.cn/sitemap.htm

Bostanterak Township (Chinese: 波斯坦铁列克乡; pinyin: Bōsītǎntiělièkè Xiāng) is a township of Wuqia County in Xinjiang Uygur Autonomous Region, China. Located in the south of the county, the township covers an area of 2,902 square kilometers with a population of 9,725 (as of 2017). It has 6 administrative villages under its jurisdiction. Its seat is at Qorbo Village (乔尔波村). Bostanterak is located 135 kilometers away south of the county seat Wuqia Town and 56 kilometers away west of Kashi City. It is bordered by Boritokay Township to the west, Shufu County to the north and northwest, Akto County to the south.

== History ==
"The name "Bostanterak" is from Kyrgyz language, it means "poplar oasis".

Bostanterak was the 1st township of the 3rd district in Wuqia County in 1950 and Bostanterak Commune (波斯坦铁列克公社) was formed in 1958, it was renamed Yongzhong Commune (永忠公社) in 1968 and restored the original name in 1980, and organized as a township in 1984.

== Settlements ==
The township has 6 administration villages and 11 unincorporated villages under its jurisdiction.

6 administration villages:

- Chorbo Village (乔尔波村, چوربو كەنتى, شورپو قىشتاعى)
- Doletbulaq Village (多来提布拉克村, دۆلەتبۇلاق كەنتى, دۅۅلۅتبۇلاق قىشتاعى)
- Iymek Village (依买克村, ئىيمەك كەنتى, يئمەك قىشتاعى)
- Juluqbash Village (居鲁克巴什村, جۇلۇقباش كەنتى, جۇلۇقباش قىشتاعى)
- Keldong Village (凯勒敦村, كېلدۆڭ كەنتى, كەلدۅڭ قىشتاعى)
- Marjanqum Village (马热加尼库木村, مارجانقۇم كەنتى, مارجانقۇم قىشتاعى)
