= Mohe railway station =

Railway station in Heilongjiang, China

Mohe railway station 漠河站

General information
- Location: Mohe County, Heilongjiang; China
- Coordinates: 52°58′N 122°32′E

History
- Opened: 1972
Location

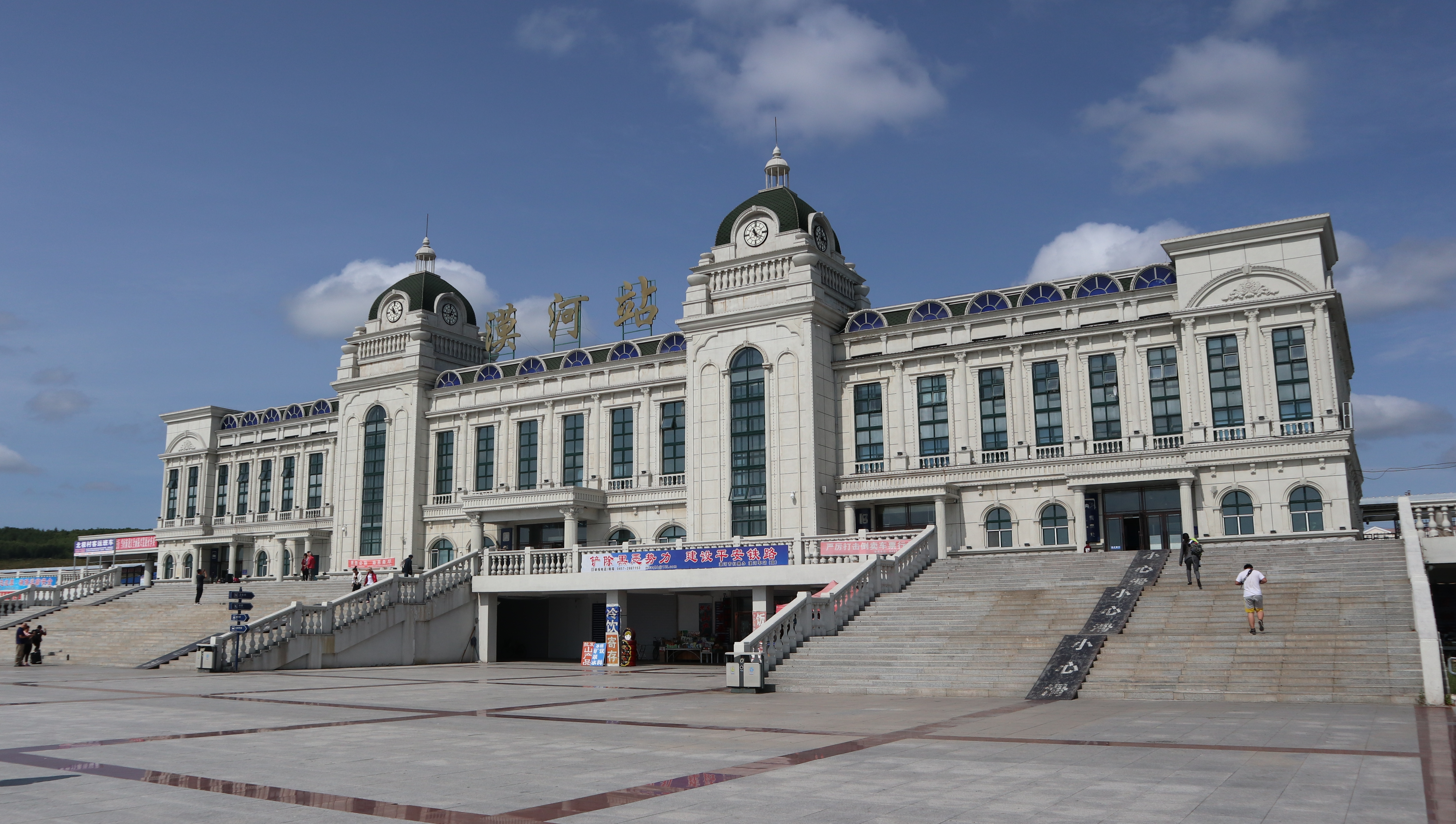
Mohe County Railway Station, Heilongjiang, China (2019)

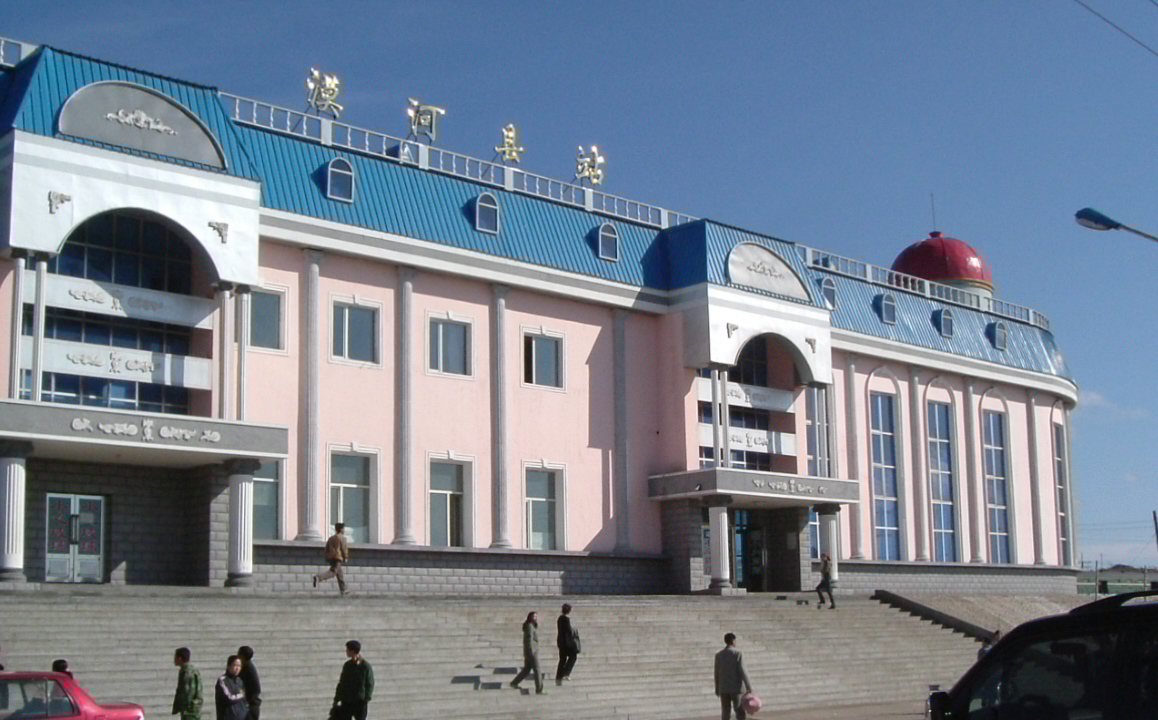
Mohe County Railway Station, Heilongjiang, China (2005)

Mohe railway station, (previous names include Mohe County Station and XilinJi station) is a railway station located in Xilinji Town, Mohe County, Heilongjiang Province. It is the north end of the Nenjiang–Greater Khingan Forest Railway and the northernmost passenger railway station in China. It is a tourist attraction due to its location, with more than 650,000 annual tourists.

The station was built in 1972 and provides passenger and freight service. Originally a level 4 station, it upgraded to a level 3 station in 2004 and renamed to Mohe County Station due to increased tourism traffic. The station and its upper and lower line are not electrified. In 2015 the station switched to a new building with running water and drainage.
