= Kezi River =

Kezi River Kirzl River Kirzlesu River
- Native name: 克孜河 (Chinese); 克孜勒河 (Chinese); 克孜勒苏河 (Chinese)

Location
- Country: China and Kyrgyzstan

Physical characteristics
- Length: 900 kilometers (within China)

The Kezi River (Chinese: 克孜河), also marked as Kirzl River (克孜勒河) and Kirzlesu River (克孜勒苏河) on the map of People's Republic of China, is a river in Xinjiang Uygur Autonomous Region of China, located in Kizilsu Kyrgyz Autonomous Prefecture.

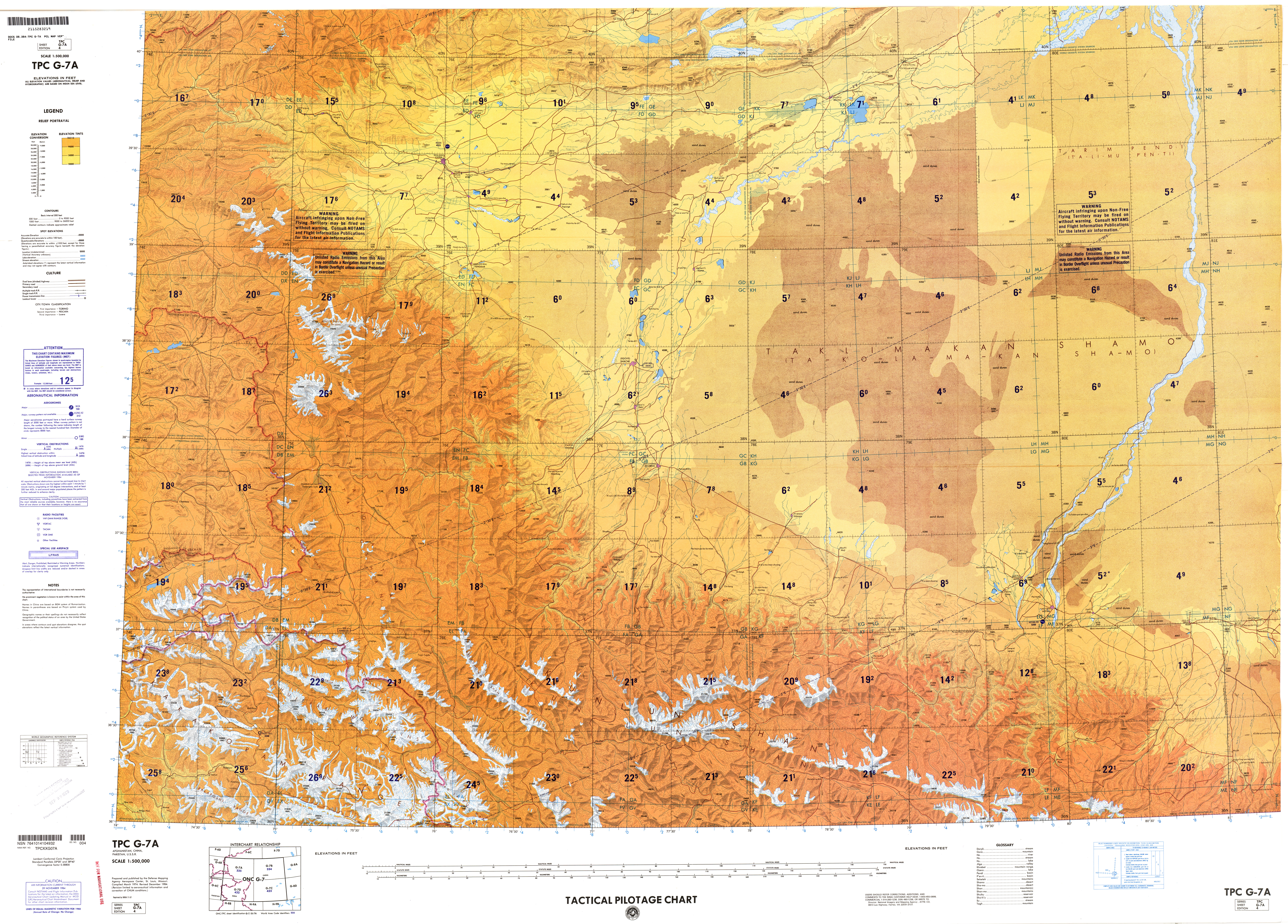
Map including K'o-tzu-le Ho (a name for the river; above 20⁴ on the map) (DMA, 1984)

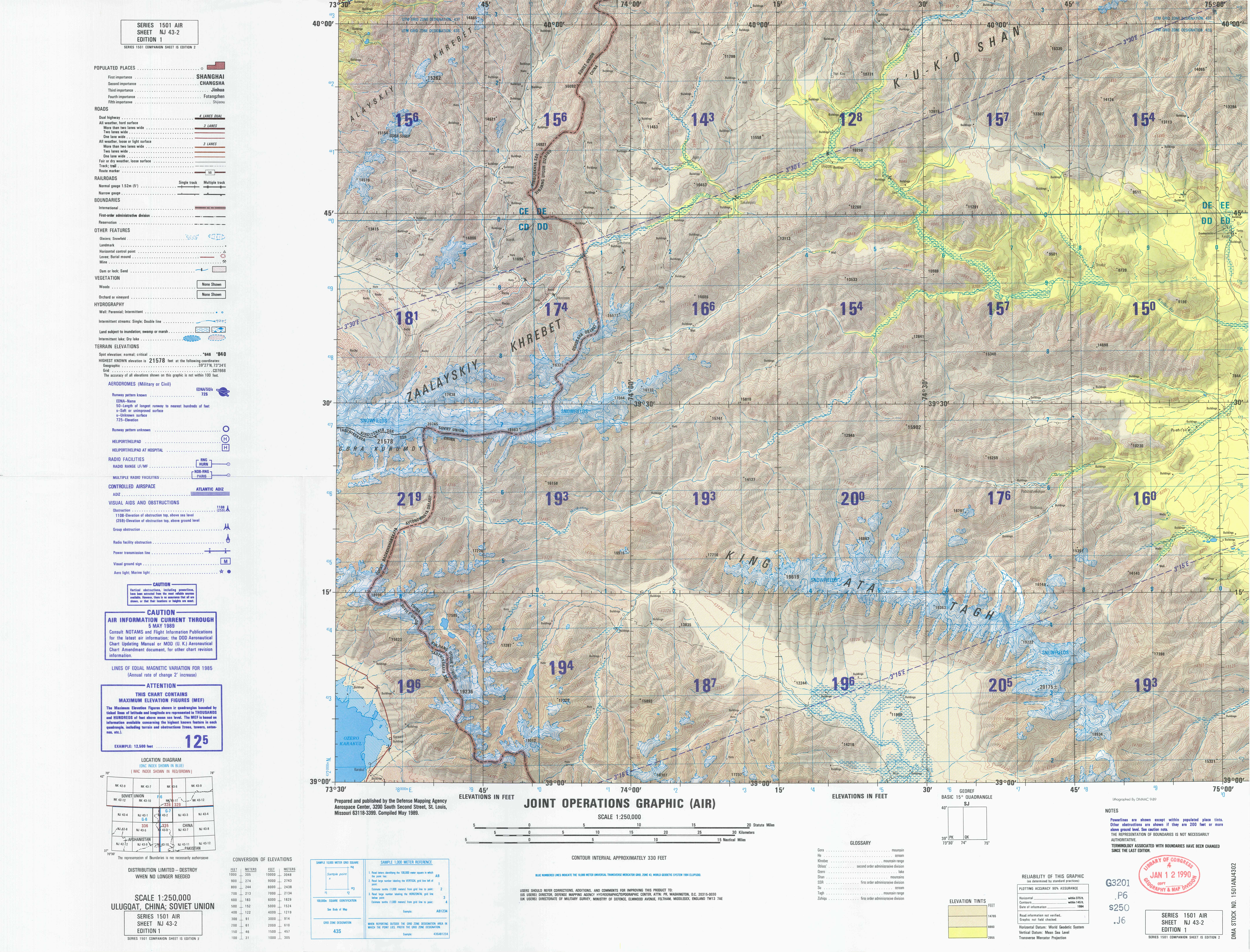
Map including Kizilsu He (a name for the river; near 15⁰ on the map) (DMA, 1989)

Kezi River originates from the Gora Kurumdy (Kurumdy I Summit) on the Kyrgyzstan–Tajikistan border and enters Wuqia County in Xinjiang through the border at Simukhana Pass (斯木哈纳山口), which is the boundary between the Tianshan and Kunlun Mountains. The river flows 900 kilometers within China, with a drainage area of 15,100 square kilometers.

Kezi River is the largest river in the Kashgar water system. In China, the river flows from west to east through Wuqia County, Kizilsu Kyrgyz Autonomous Prefecture, Shufu County, Shule County, Kashgar City, Jiashi City, and Bachu County in Kashgar Prefecture, and finally meets the Yarkant River and joins the Tarim River basin.

The Kashi segment (Xinjiang) of Kezi River was badly polluted. In 2016, the control unit in the Kashgar Prefecture of the Kezi River was upgraded from worse than Grade V to Grade V.
