= Daxing'anling Prefecture =

Prefecture of Heilongjiang, China

Daxing'anling Prefecture 大兴安岭地区
- Prefecture
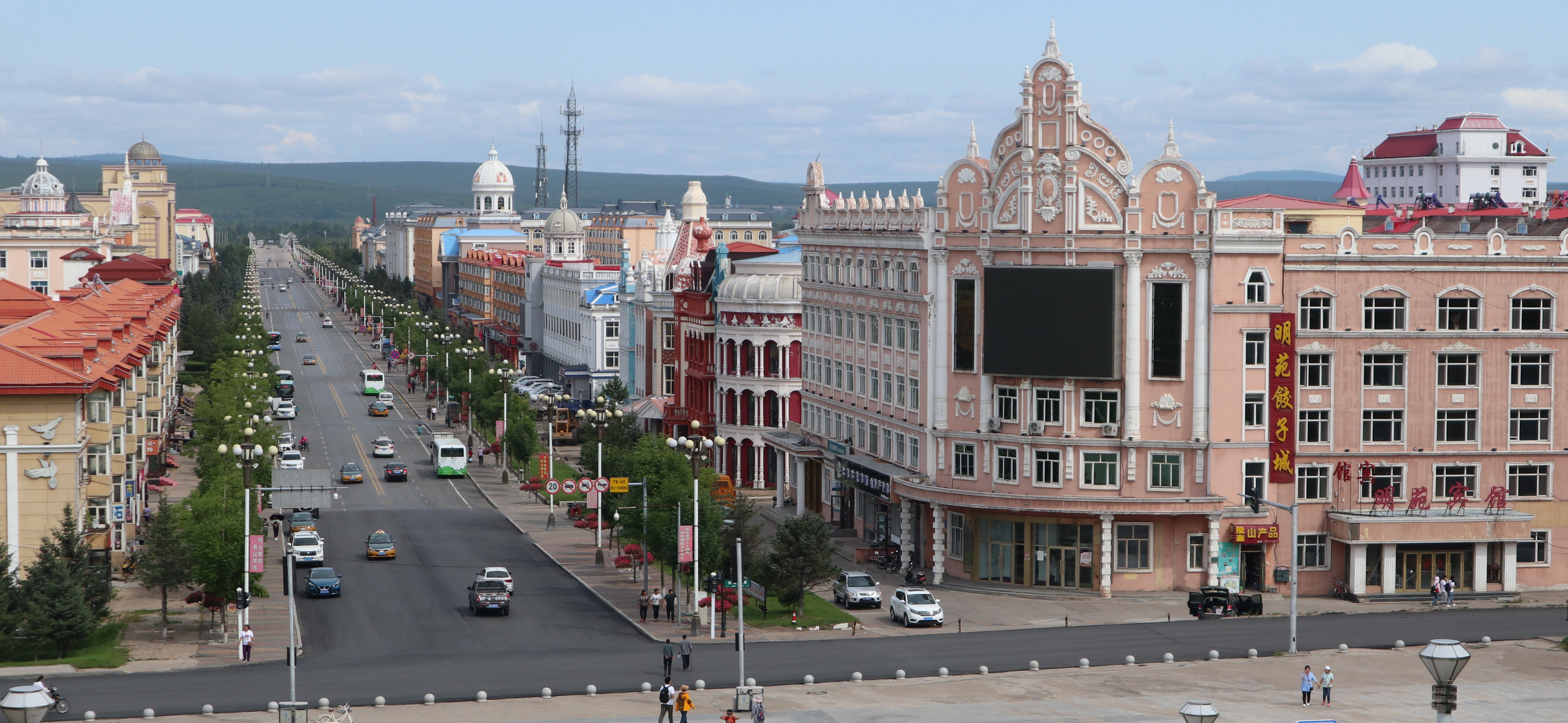
- Mohe city

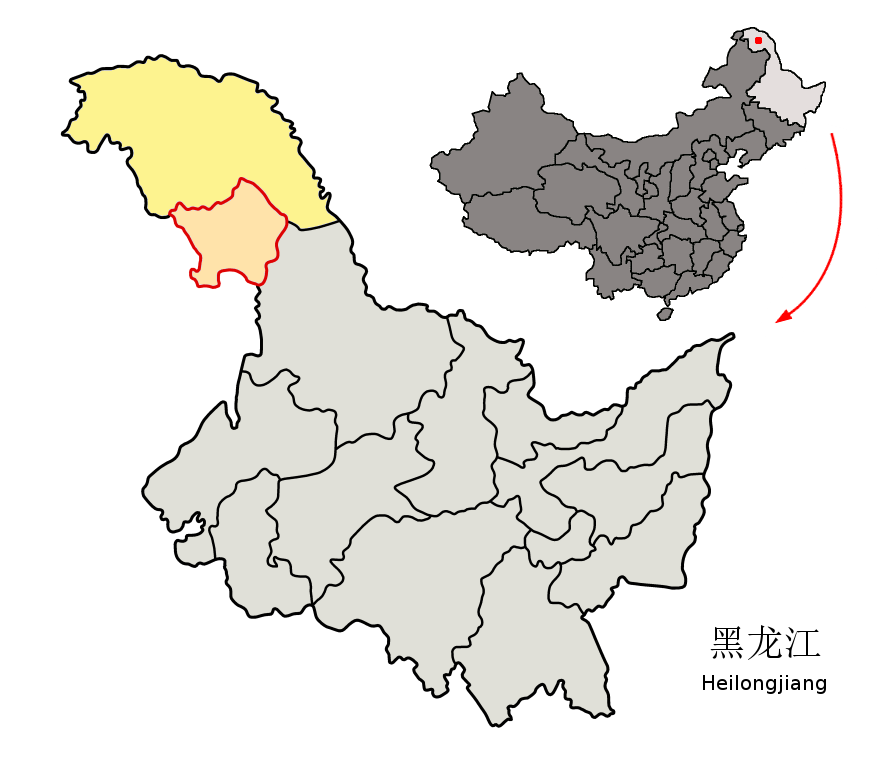
- Location of Daxing'anling (yellow) in Heilongjiang (light grey);
- Coordinates: 52°30′N 123°54′E
- Country: People's Republic of China
- Province: Heilongjiang
- County-level divisions: 4 administrative zones 1 county-level city 2 counties
- Township-level divisions: 6 subdistricts 24 towns 11 townships 2 ethnic townships
- Village-level divisions: 41 residential communities 80 villages

Area
  - Total: 82,929 km^{2} (32,019 sq mi)

Population (2022)
  - Total: 388,000
  - Density: 4.68/km^{2} (12.1/sq mi)

GDP
  - Total: CN¥ 13.5 billion US$ 2.2 billion
  - Per capita: CN¥ 27,817; US$ 4,466
- Time zone: UTC+8 (China Standard)
- Postal code: 165000
- Area code: 0457
- ISO 3166 code: CN-HL-27
- Website: www.dxal.gov.cn

Daxing'anling Prefecture
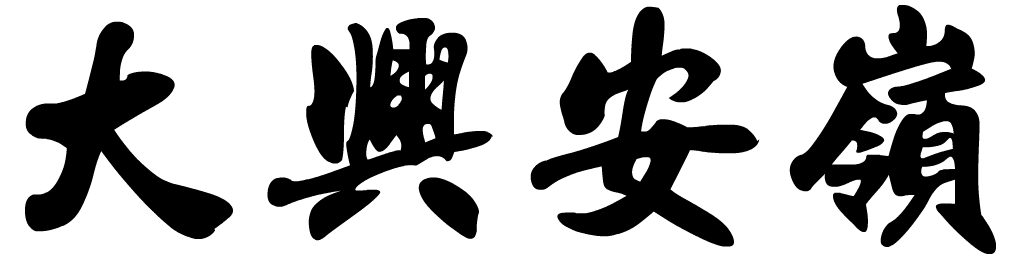
- "Daxing'anling", as written in Chinese calligraphy

Chinese name
- Simplified Chinese: 大兴安岭地区
- Traditional Chinese: 大興安嶺地區
Transcriptions
Standard Mandarin
- Hanyu Pinyin: Dà Xīng'ān Lǐng Dìqū

Manchu name
- Manchu script: ᠠᠮᠪᠠ ᡥᡳᠨ᠋ᡤᡤᠠᠨ ᠵᡠᡨ᠊ᡠᠨ ᡳ ᠪᠠ
- Romanization: Amba'hingan'dabagan i'ba

Russian name
- Russian: Округ Да-Хинган-Лин

Daxing'anling (simplified Chinese: 大兴安岭地区; traditional Chinese: 大興安嶺地區; pinyin: Dàxīng'ānlǐng Dìqū; Russian: Да-Хинган-Лин), also known as Da Hinggan Ling, is the northernmost Chinese prefecture-level division, located in northwestern Heilongjiang Province. It covers 46,755 km^{2} (18,052 sq mi) and had a population of 520,000, as of 2004. According to the data of the annual report of public security, the total population of the region at the end of the year is 369,831. It is named after the Greater Khingan Range (Daxing'anling; ᠠᠮᠪᠠ᠋ ᡥᡳᠨ᠋ᡤᡤᠠᠨ ᠵᡠᡨ᠊ᡠᠨ; Amba Hinggan Dabagan) Mountains. In 2007, it had a GDP of RMB 6.1 billion and a growth rate of 11.1%. In 2015, Daxing'anling Prefecture had a GDP of RMB 13.49 billion, and a GDP of RMB 15.39 billion in the year 2014.

== Administrative divisions ==
Daxing'anling Prefecture administrates 1 county-level city, 2 counties, and 4 administration zones. These counties and management districts collectively contain 6 urban subdistricts, 24 towns, 11 townships, 2 ethnic townships, 41 residential communities, and 80 villages.

Map
Name	Hanzi	Hanyu Pinyin	Population (2010 Census)	Area (km^{2})	Density (/km^{2})
City
Mohe city	漠河市	Mòhé Shì	83,414	18,367	4.5
Counties
Tahe County	塔河县	Tǎhé Xiàn	92,473	14,103	6.6
Huma County	呼玛县	Hūmǎ Xiàn	51,861	14,300	3.6
Administrative Zones
Huzhong Administrative Zone*	呼中行政区	Hūzhōng Xíngzhèngqū	45,039	9,400	4.8
Xinlin Administrative Zone*	新林行政区	Xīnlín Xíngzhèngqū	50,859	8,700	5.8
Songling Administrative Zone*	松岭行政区	Sōnglǐng Xíngzhèngqū	33,555	16,800	2.0
Jiagedaqi Administrative Zone*	加格达奇行政区	Jiāgédáqí Xíngzhèngqū	154,363	1,587	97
*All administrative zones are management areas; not administrative divisions registered under the Ministry of Civil Affairs.

=== Forestry divisions ===
Administered by the State Forestry Administration's Heilongjiang Daxing'anling Forestry Group Corporation (Chinese: 黑龙江省大兴安岭林业集团公司) with 10 Forestry Bureaus and 61 Woodlands.

Name	Hanzi	Residence	Woodlands
Songling Forestry Bureau	松岭林业局	Xiaoyangqi Town, Songling	5
Xinlin Forestry Bureau	新林林业局	Xinlin Town, Xinlin	8
Tahe Forestry Bureau	塔河林业局	Tahe Town, Tahe	6
Huzhong Forestry Bureau	呼中林业局	Huzhong Town, Huzhong	6
Amur Forestry Bureau	阿木尔林业局	Jitao Town, Mohe	6
Tuqiang Forestry Bureau	图强林业局	Tuqiang Town, Mohe	7
Xilinji Forestry Bureau	西林吉林业局	Xilinji Town, Mohe	5
Shibazhan Forestry Bureau	十八站林业局	Shibazhan Township, Tahe	6
Hanjiayuan Forestry Bureau	韩家园林业局	Hanjiayuan Town, Huma	1
Jiagedaqi Forestry Bureau	加格达奇林业局	Jiagedaqi District	10

Administered by Daxing'anling Prefecture Administrative Operation Forestry Bureau (Chinese: 大兴安岭地区行政公署营林局) with 3 County-level Forestry Bureaus and 6 Woodlands.

Name	Hanzi	Residence	Woodlands
Huma Forestry Bureau	呼玛县林业局	Huma Town, Huma	4
Tahe Forestry Bureau	塔河县林业局	Tahe Town, Tahe	1
Mohe Forestry Bureau	漠河市林业局	Xilinji Town, Mohe	1

== Demographics ==
According to the Seventh National Census in 2020, the city's Permanent Population (Hukou) was 331,276. Compared with the permanent resident population of 511,560 in the Sixth national census in 2010, it decreased by 180,284, a drop of 35.24%, with an average annual decline of 4.25%.
