= Taklamakan Desert =

Desert in Xinjiang, China

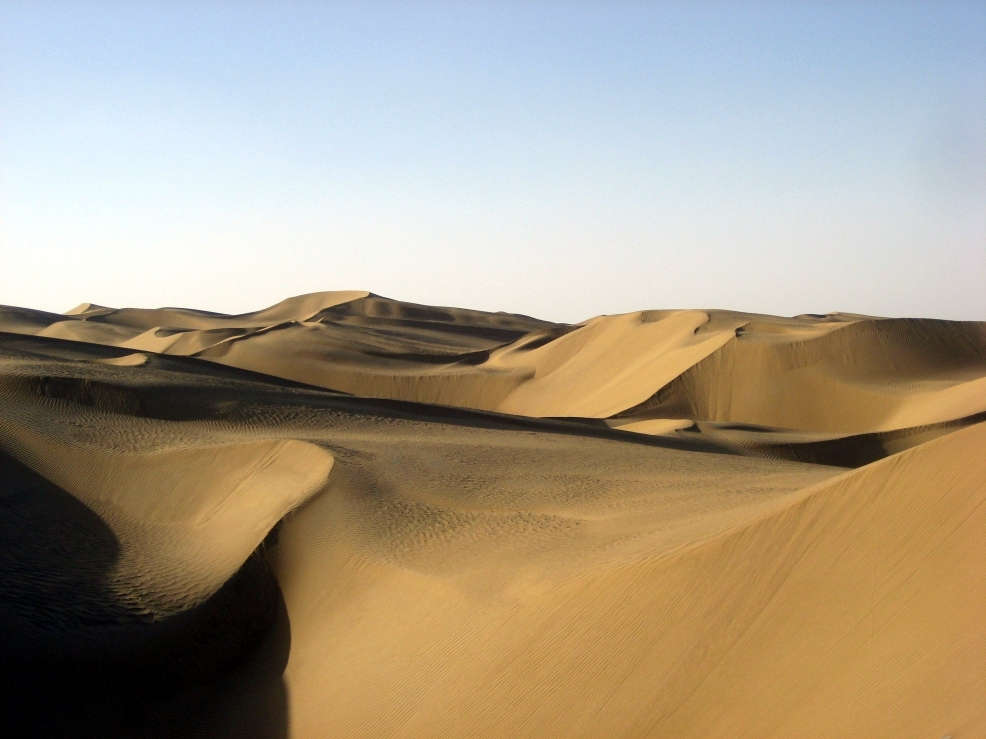
- View of the Taklamakan desert

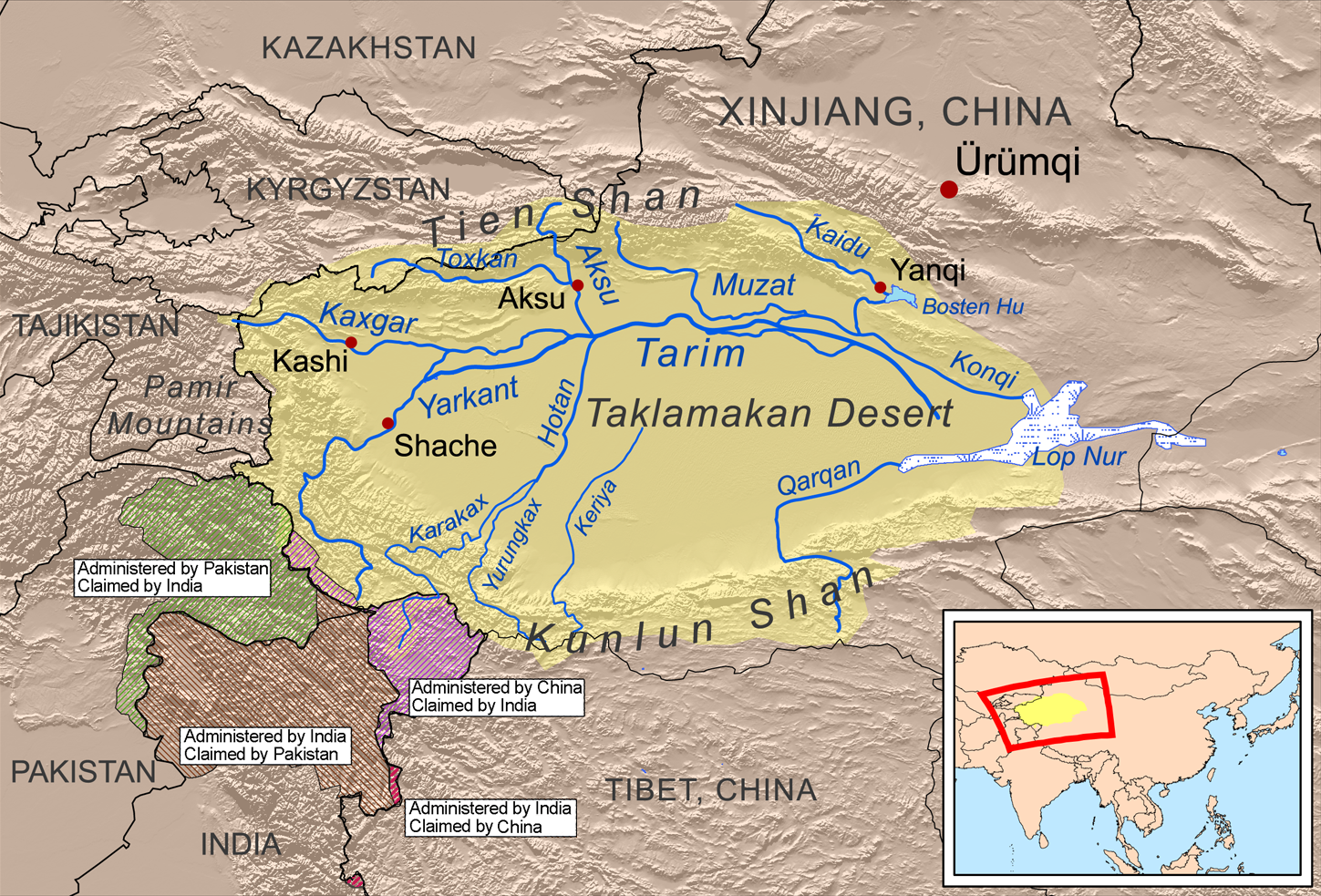
- Taklamakan Desert and Tarim Basin
- Area: 337,000 km^{2} (130,000 mi^{2})

Geography
- Country: China
- State/Province: Xinjiang
- Coordinates: 38.9°N 82.2°E

Chinese name
- Traditional Chinese: 塔克拉瑪干沙漠
- Simplified Chinese: 塔克拉玛干沙漠
Transcriptions
Standard Mandarin
- Hanyu Pinyin: Tǎkèlāmǎgān Shāmò
- Wade–Giles: Tʻa³-kʻo⁴-la¹-ma³-kan¹ Sha^{1}-mo^{4}
other Mandarin
- Xiao'erjing: تَاكْلامَاقًا شَاموْ
Southern Min
- Hokkien POJ: Thah-khek-lá-má-kan Soa-bo̍k

Uyghur name
- Uyghur: تەكلىماكان قۇملۇقى
Transcriptions
- Latin Yëziqi: Teklimakan qumluqi
- Yengi Yeziⱪ: Təklimakan ⱪumluⱪi
- Siril Yëziqi: Тәклимакан қумлуқи

The Taklamakan Desert (/ˌtækləməˈkæn/ TAK-lə-mə-KAN) is a desert in northwestern China. Located inside the Tarim Basin in Southern Xinjiang, it is bounded by the Kunlun Mountains to the south, the Pamir Mountains to the west, the Tian Shan range to the north, and the Gobi Desert to the east.

== Etymology ==
While most researchers agree that makan is the Arabic word for "place," makān, the etymology of "takla" remains unclear. The word may be a Uyghur borrowing of the Arabic tark, "to leave alone/out/behind, relinquish, abandon" + makan. Another plausible explanation suggests it is derived from Turki taqlar makan, describing "the place of ruins". Chinese scholars Wang Guowei and Huang Wenbi linked the name to the Tocharians, a historical people of the Tarim Basin, making the meaning of "Taklamakan" similar to "Tocharistan". According to Uyghur researcher Turdi Mettursun Kara, the name Taklamakan comes from the expression Terk-i Mekan. The name is first mentioned as Terk-i Makan (ترك مكان / trk mkan) in the book called Tevarih-i Muskiyun, which was written in 1867 in the Hotan Prefecture of Xinjiang.

In folk etymology, it is said to mean "Place of No Return" or "get in and you'll never get out".

== Geography ==
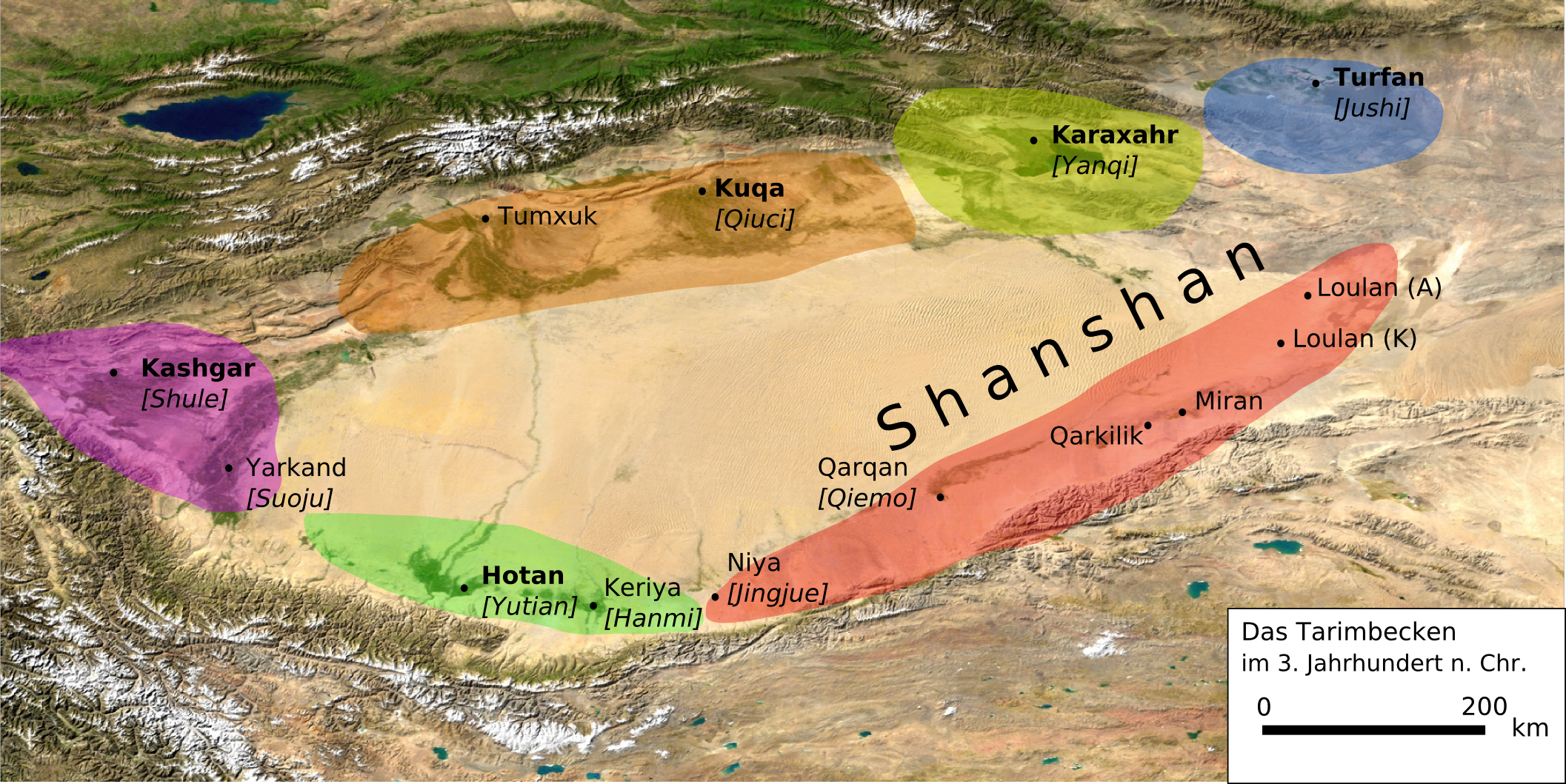
Settlements, 3rd century AD.

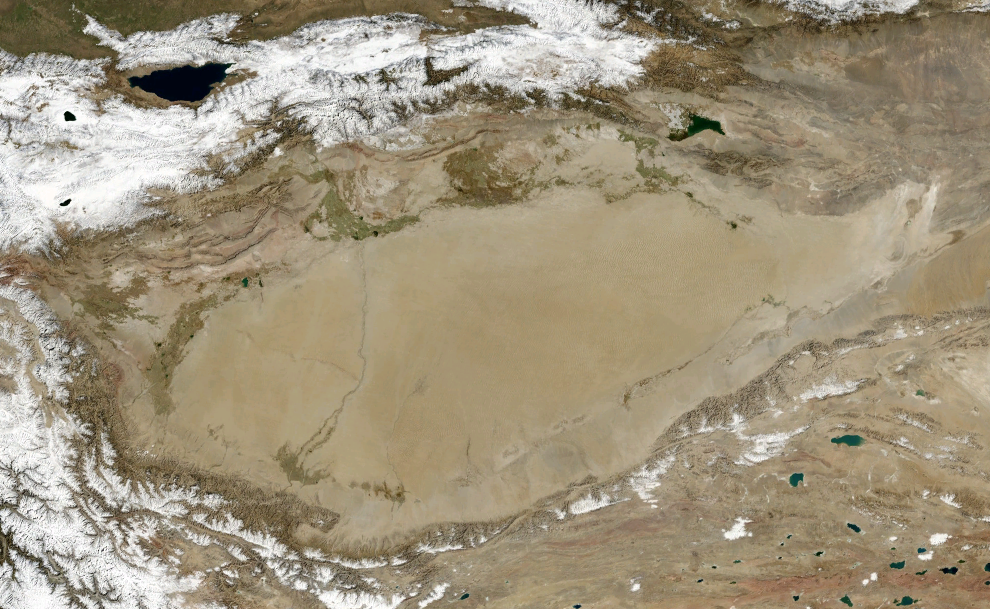
Taklamakan by NASA World Wind

The Taklamakan Desert has an area of 337,000 km^{2} (130,000 sq mi), making it slightly smaller than Germany. The desert is part of the Tarim Basin, which is 1,000 kilometres (620 mi) long and 400 kilometres (250 mi) wide. It is crossed at its northern and at its southern edge by two branches of the Silk Road, by which travellers sought to avoid the arid wasteland. It ranks 15th in size in a ranking of the world's largest deserts. Dunes range in height from 60 feet (18 m) up to as much as 300 feet (91 m). The few breaks in this sea of sand are small patches of alluvial clay. Generally, the steeper sides of the dunes face away from the prevailing winds. The Taklamakan, as with all of Outer China, is a land of extremes, with hot summers and cold winters. Sandstorms are likely and dangerous. In many cases, permanent settlement is only by oases.

The People's Republic of China has constructed two cross-desert highways. The Tarim Desert Highway links the cities of Hotan (on the southern edge) and Luntai (on the northern edge) and the Bayingol to Ruoqiang road crosses the desert to the east.

As a shifting sand desert, sand dunes constantly shift under the influence of the wind. As a result, moving sand dunes erode grasslands and residential areas.

"When I woke up one morning, I found I couldn't open the door because of the weight of sand that had accumulated overnight. My crops were buried too, so I had no choice but to move" -Memet Simay, Qira County resident

The Golmud-Korla Railway crosses the Taklamakan as well.

Named areas in the desert include Ha-la-ma, A-lang-ha and Mai-k'o-tsa-k'o. The Mazartag mountains are located in the western part of the desert.

=== Green belt ===
In 1978, the Chinese government launched the Green Great Wall project, aiming to create a forest chain extending from Xinjiang to Heilongjiang in northern China, to prevent desertification as well as harness the region's renewable energy potential. It is one of the largest afforestation projects in the world. By 2024, a 3,050-kilometre (1,900-mile) green belt had been completed, encircling the desert with sand-stabilizing vegetation and solar-powered sand control systems.

The project involved planting desert poplar, saxaul, and red willow trees, particularly in southern areas like Yutian County. These efforts aim to reduce sandstorms, protect infrastructure, and improve ecological stability.

The initiative complements infrastructure developments such as the Hotan–Ruoqiang railway, the first railway loop around a desert and large-scale renewable energy projects. Plans by the China Three Gorges Corporation include the construction of 8.5 gigawatts of solar power and 4 gigawatts of wind energy generation capacity in the region.

== Climate ==
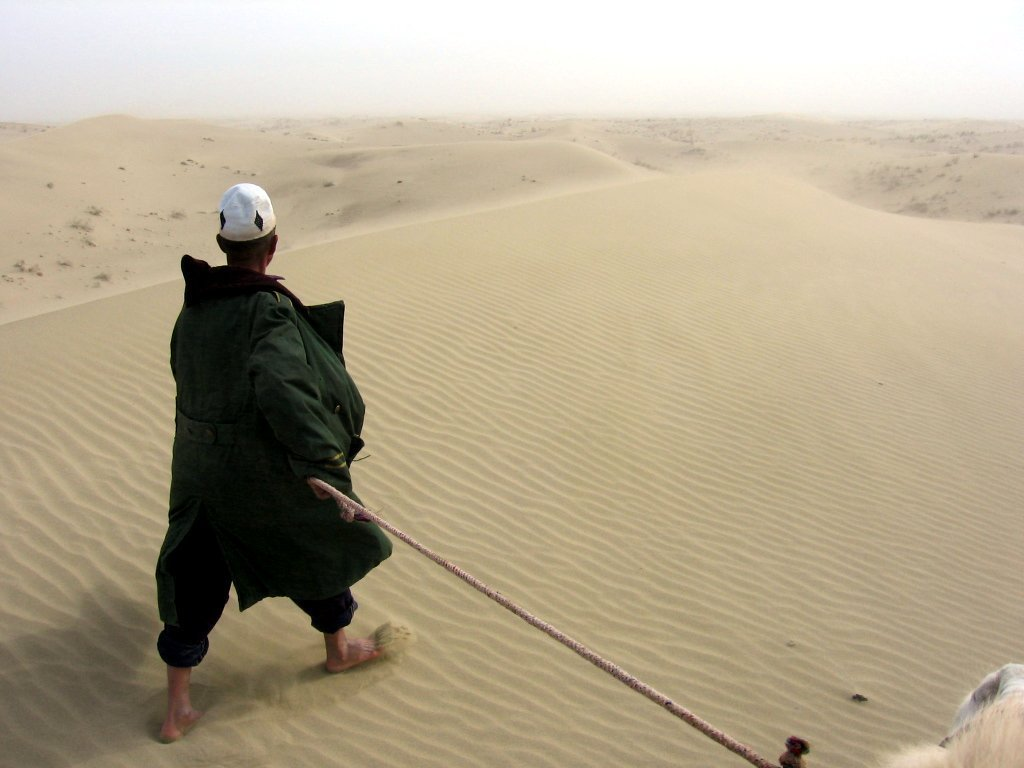
Desert life near Yarkand

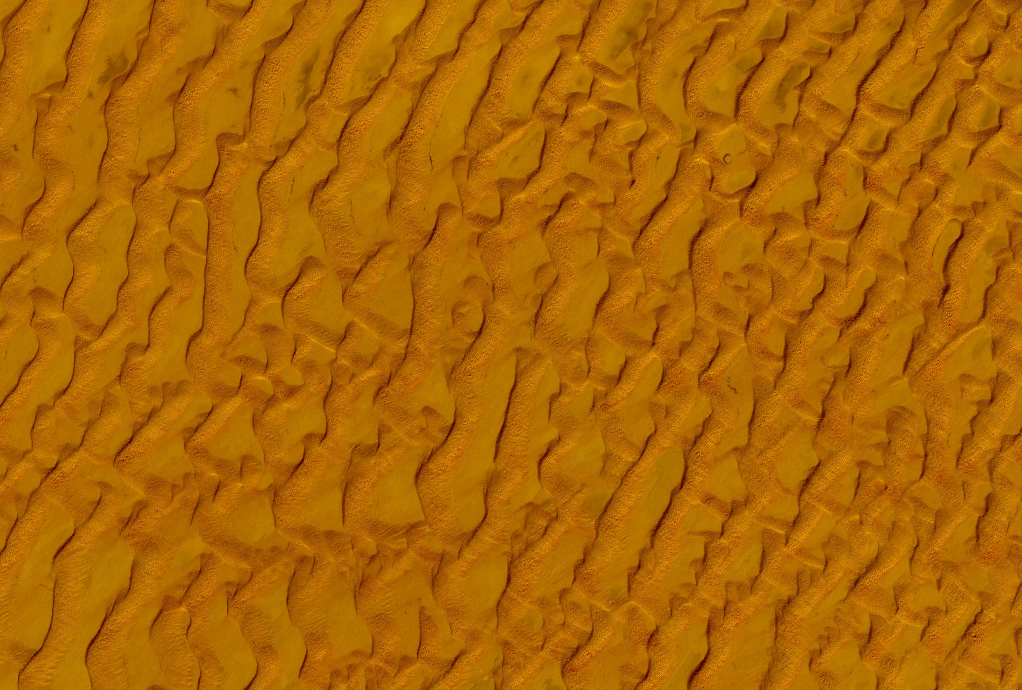
Sand dunes captured by NASA's Landsat-7

Because it lies in the rain shadow of the Himalayas, the Taklamakan has a cold desert climate. Given its relative proximity with the cold to frigid air masses in Siberia, extreme temperatures are recorded in wintertime, sometimes well below −20 °C (−4 °F), while in summer they can rise up to 40 °C (104 °F). During the 2008 Chinese winter storms episode, the Taklamakan was reported to be covered, for the first time in its recorded history, entirely with a thin layer of snow, reaching 4 centimetres (1.6 in), with a temperature of −26.1 °C (−15 °F) in some observatories.

Its extreme inland position, effectively at the very center of Asia, and thousands of kilometres from any open body of water, accounts for its somewhat wide diurnal temperature variation.

=== Spring dust storms ===
Spring, when wind patterns shift and the especially dry land with minimal vegetation warms rapidly, is peak dust storm season, especially in the southern part of the desert. The sun heats near-surface dust, fueling pockets of convection. Satellite observations by the Japanese Himawari-9 show the dust creeping upward in mountain valleys throughout the day. Data from NASA's MODIS instruments show 1.5% decrease in the amount of atmospheric dust in the area each year since the early 2000s.

Climate data for Taklamakan Desert (Tazhong), elevation 1,099 m (3,606 ft), (1991–2020 normals, extremes 1981–2010)
Month	Jan	Feb	Mar	Apr	May	Jun	Jul	Aug	Sep	Oct	Nov	Dec	Year
Record high °C (°F)	16.3 (61.3)	17.2 (63.0)	32.7 (90.9)	37.0 (98.6)	38.2 (100.8)	41.6 (106.9)	45.6 (114.1)	42.7 (108.9)	39.5 (103.1)	31.9 (89.4)	24.7 (76.5)	16.7 (62.1)	45.6 (114.1)
Mean daily maximum °C (°F)	−0.4 (31.3)	7.0 (44.6)	17.5 (63.5)	25.6 (78.1)	30.5 (86.9)	34.3 (93.7)	36.3 (97.3)	35.5 (95.9)	30.4 (86.7)	22.2 (72.0)	11.0 (51.8)	1.3 (34.3)	20.9 (69.7)
Daily mean °C (°F)	−10.0 (14.0)	−2.5 (27.5)	8.0 (46.4)	16.5 (61.7)	21.9 (71.4)	26.3 (79.3)	28.3 (82.9)	27.3 (81.1)	21.3 (70.3)	11.4 (52.5)	0.2 (32.4)	−8.5 (16.7)	11.7 (53.0)
Mean daily minimum °C (°F)	−18.3 (−0.9)	−11.9 (10.6)	−2.0 (28.4)	6.9 (44.4)	12.7 (54.9)	17.8 (64.0)	20.0 (68.0)	18.7 (65.7)	11.7 (53.1)	1.1 (34.0)	−8.6 (16.5)	−16.2 (2.8)	2.7 (36.8)
Record low °C (°F)	−32.6 (−26.7)	−32.7 (−26.9)	−12.3 (9.9)	−8.3 (17.1)	1.2 (34.2)	7.2 (45.0)	11.1 (52.0)	6.8 (44.2)	0.6 (33.1)	−8.4 (16.9)	−18.0 (−0.4)	−24.7 (−12.5)	−32.7 (−26.9)
Average precipitation mm (inches)	0.5 (0.02)	0.4 (0.02)	0.2 (0.01)	0.7 (0.03)	3.7 (0.15)	9.8 (0.39)	5.4 (0.21)	3.5 (0.14)	0.7 (0.03)	0.7 (0.03)	0.1 (0.00)	0.1 (0.00)	25.8 (1.03)
Average precipitation days (≥ 0.1 mm)	0.8	0.3	0.3	0.3	1.8	3.5	3.5	1.8	0.8	0.4	0.1	0.6	14.2
Average snowy days	2.7	1.1	0	0	0	0	0	0	0	0	0.3	2.8	6.9
Average relative humidity (%)	55	40	23	20	24	29	30	28	29	34	45	56	34
Mean monthly sunshine hours	188.5	191.2	220.7	222.0	251.4	240.6	246.8	246.3	253.9	262.7	216.9	184.1	2,725.1
Percentage possible sunshine	62	62	59	55	56	54	55	59	69	78	73	63	62
Source: China Meteorological Administration

== Oasis ==
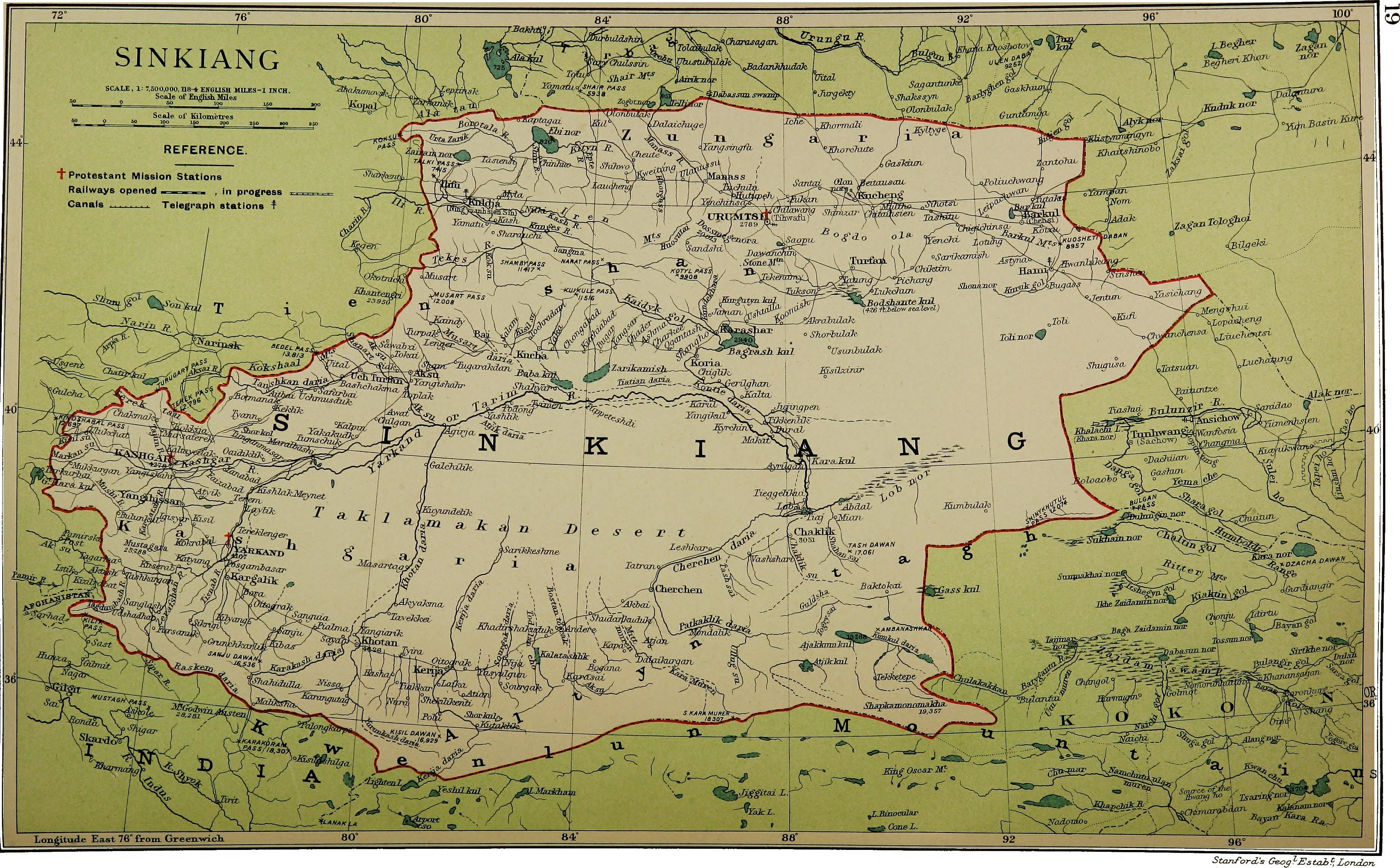
Map including the Taklamakan Desert (1917)

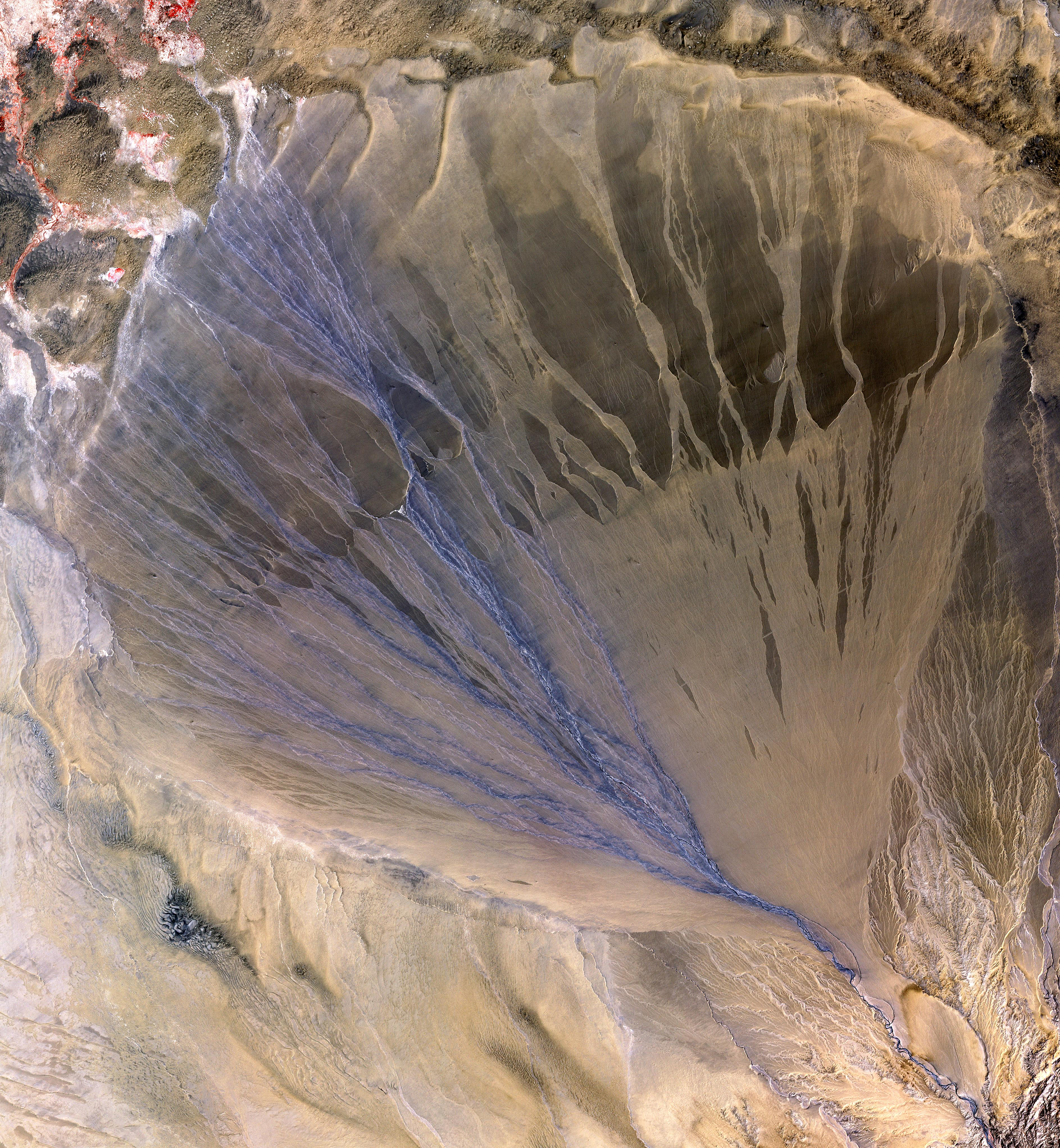
The Molcha (Moleqie) River forms a vast alluvial fan at the southern border of the Taklamakan Desert, as it leaves the Altyn-Tagh mountains and enters the desert in the western part of the Qiemo County. The left side appears blue from water flowing in many streams. The picture is taken in May, when the river is full with the snow/glacier meltwater.

The Taklamakan Desert has very little water, making it hazardous to cross. Merchant caravans on the Silk Road would stop for relief at its thriving oasis towns. It was in close proximity to many ancient civilizations—to the Northwest is the Amu Darya basin, to the southwest the Afghanistan mountain passes lead to Iran and India, to the east is China, and even to the north ancient towns such as Almaty can be found.

The key oasis towns, watered by rainfall from the mountains, were Kashgar, Miran, Niya, Yarkand, and Khotan (Hetian) to the south, Kuqa and Turpan in the north, and Loulan and Dunhuang in the east. Now, many sites, such as Miran and Gaochang, stand in ruins, and encompass sparsely inhabited zones in the modern Xinjiang Autonomous Region of the People's Republic of China.

Numerous archaeological treasures have been found in the sand-buried ruins of the Taklamakan. They point to Tocharian, early Hellenistic, Indian, and Buddhist influences. Its treasures and dangers have been vividly described by Aurel Stein, Sven Hedin, Albert von Le Coq, and Paul Pelliot. Mummies, some dated to as far back as 4000 years, have been found in the region.

Later, the Taklamakan was inhabited by Turkic peoples. The Indo-European-speaking Tocharians were assimilated by the Turkic Uyghurs who migrated into the Tarim Basin around the 9th century. Starting with the Han dynasty, the Chinese sporadically extended their control to the oasis cities of the Taklamakan Desert to control important silk road trade routes across Central Asia. Periods of Chinese rule were interspersed with rule by Turkic, Mongol and Tibetan peoples. The present population consists largely of Turkic Uyghur people and ethnic Han Chinese.

== Scientific exploration ==
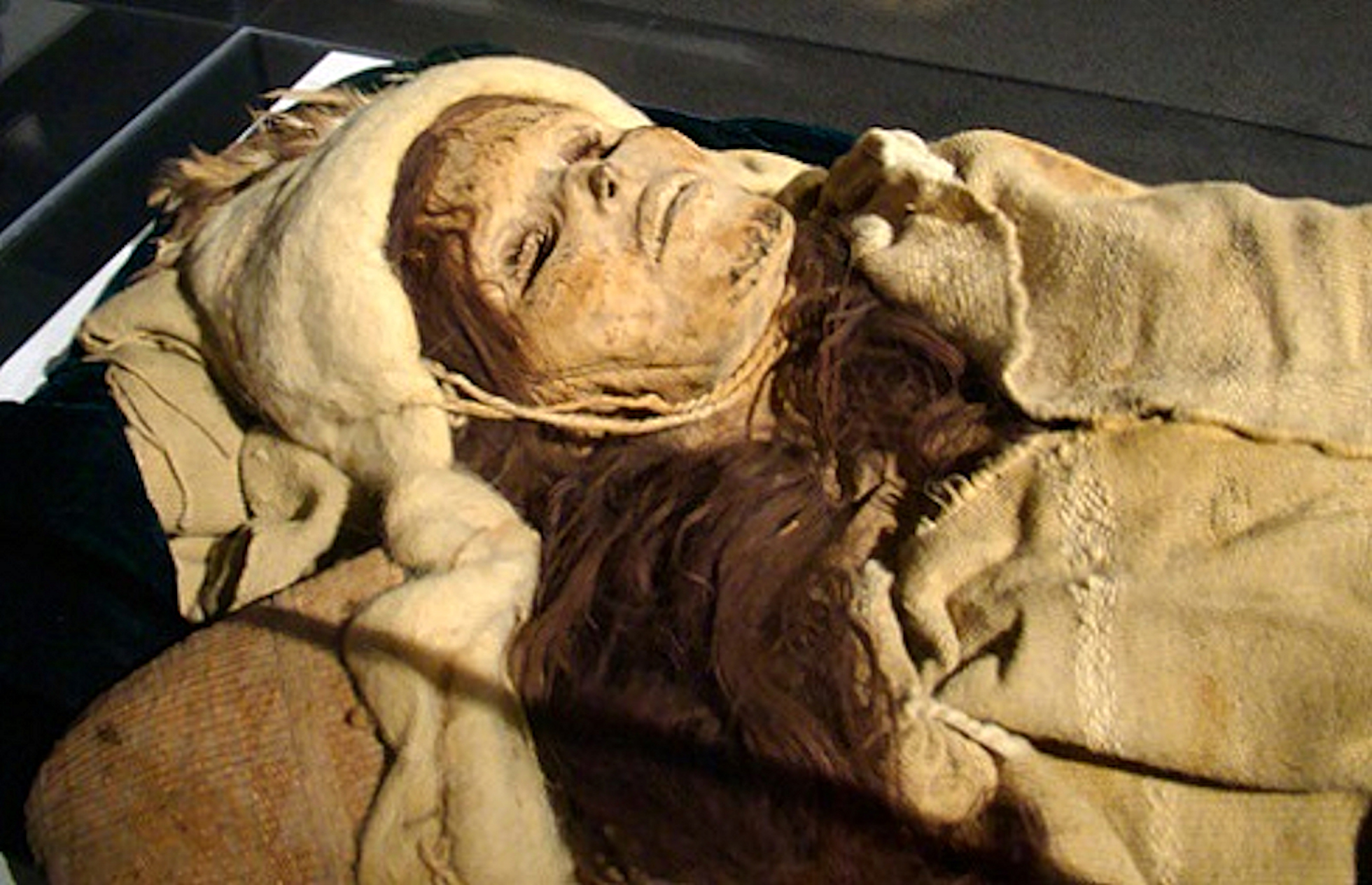
"Princess of Xiaohe", one of the Tarim mummies, the "best representatives" of Ancient North Eurasians. The mummy was discovered in 2003.

This desert was explored by several scholars, including Xuanzang, a 7th-century Buddhist monk, and, in the 20th century, the archaeologist Aurel Stein.

Atmospheric studies have shown that dust originating from the Taklamakan is blown over the Pacific, where it contributes to cloud formation over the Western United States. Further, the traveling dust redistributes minerals from the Taklamakan to the western U.S. via rainfall. Studies have shown that a specific class of mineral found in the dust, known as K-feldspar, triggers ice formation particularly well. K-feldspar is particularly susceptible to corrosion by acidic atmospheric pollution, such as nitrates and phosphates; exposure to these constituents reduces the ability of the dust to trigger water droplet formation.

In May 2023, China announced that it would drill a hole to around 11 kilometres (36,000 ft) depth to investigate the layers of crust in that area. It will not be as deep as the Kola Superdeep Borehole (12,262 metres (40,230 ft).

== Transportation ==
The Taklamakan Desert is surrounded by the Taklamakan Desert railway loop. The Southern Xinjiang Railway branches from the Lanxin Railway near Turpan, follows the north side of the basin to Kashgar, and curves southeast to Khotan, while Hotan–Ruoqiang railway loops around the south and west side of the rail line. In total, the Taklamakan Desert railway loop contains four different railway lines, including the sections of the Golmud–Korla railway, Hotan–Ruoqiang railway, Kashgar–Hotan railway, and Southern Xinjiang railway. Roads and highways are also available in the desert.

== In popular culture ==
The desert is the main setting for Chinese film series Painted Skin and Painted Skin: The Resurrection. The Chinese TV series Candle in the Tomb is mostly spent in this desert as they are searching for the Niya ruins.

The issue No. 39 Soft Places of Neil Gaiman's The Sandman takes place in the desert, when Marco Polo gets lost in the desert.

A portion of the Korean quasi-historical TV drama series Queen Seondeok takes place in the Taklamakan Desert. Sohwa escapes from Silla with baby Deokman and raises her in the desert. As a teenager, Deokman returns to Silla and uses the knowledge and experience gained from life among international traders in the Taklamakan trading centers to gain the throne of Silla.

The desert is showcased in the Japanese animation Mobile Suit Gundam 00, set in the year 2307. On the series, the Taklamakan Desert is the setting of a large-scale military joint operation performed by all the world's blocks of power, and interdicted by the paramilitary organization Celestial Being.

In Philip Pullman's The Book of Dust trilogy, the Taklamakan Desert appears in a parallel version named the Karamakan Desert.

== See also ==
- Bezeklik Caves – Buddhist cave grottos in Xinjiang, China
- Cities along the Silk Road
- List of deserts by area
- Mount Imeon – Ancient name for major Asia massif
- Taklamakania, named for the desert
- Tazhong, town at centre of Taklamakan Desert
- Turpan water system – Irrigation system

== Videography ==
- Treasure seekers : China's frozen desert, National Geographic Society (2001)
