= Pishan railway station =

Rail station in Pishan, China

Pishan Railway Station 皮山站

General information
- Location: Pishan County, Hotan Prefecture, Xinjiang; China
- Coordinates: 37.564350°N 78.281797°E
- Operator: CR Ürümqi
- Line: Kashgar–Hotan railway

Other information
- Station code: Telegraph code: PSR; Pinyin code: PSH; TMIS code: 43160

History
- Opened: 20 June 2011

Services
Preceding station	China Railway	Following station
Kuoshan towards Kashgar	Kashgar–Hotan railway	Zanggui towards Hotan
Location

Pishan railway station (Chinese: 皮山站; pinyin: Píshān zhàn) is a railway station located in Pishan County along the Kashgar-Hotan railway. It was opened on 20 June 2011. It is operated by the China Railway Ürümqi Group.

== Around the station ==
- Pishan Vocational and Technical School
- Pishan Senior High School
- Pishan Environmental Protection Bureau
- Pishan Housing Bureau
- Pishan No. 3 Middle School
- Pishan No. 4 Elementary School
- Pishan Public Security Bureau
- Pishan Sanxia Industrial Park

== History ==
The station was built in 2010.
