= Moyu =

Moyu may refer to:

- Moyu, the edible corm of the plant Amorphophallus konjac (konjac)
- Karakax County, or Moyu County, in Xinjiang, China
  - Moyu railway station
- Jin Moyu (1918–2014), also known as Aisin Gioro Xianqi, Chinese educator and the last surviving Manchu princess
