= Tarim Desert Highway =

Road in Xinjiang, China

Coordinates: 38°54′N 83°49′E

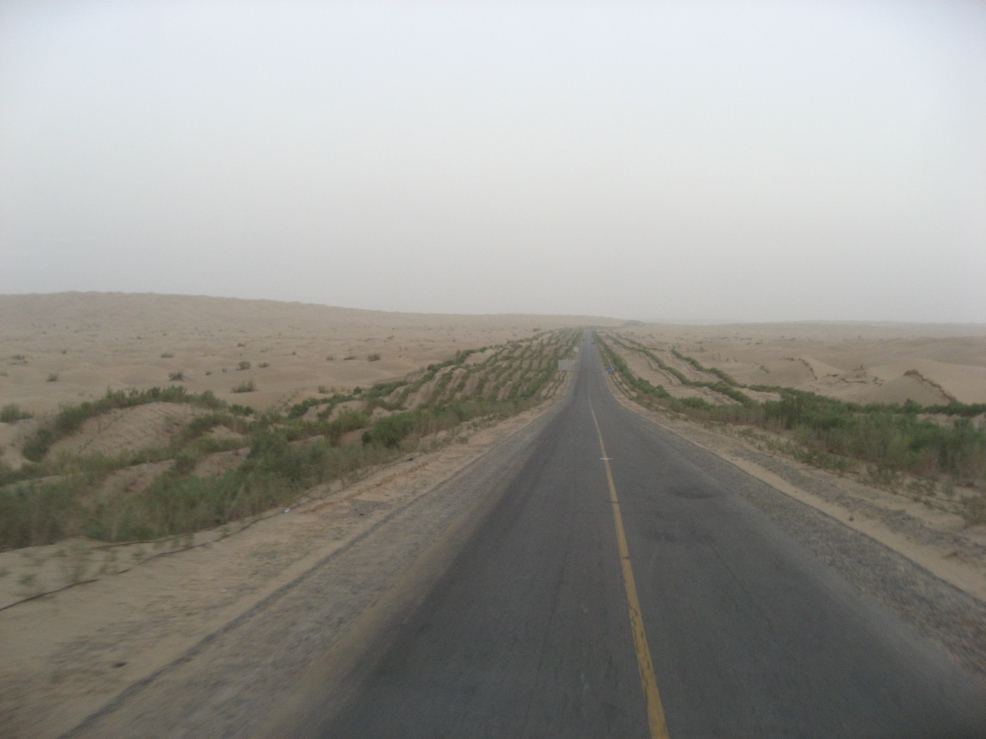
Vegetation on either side of the highway to prevent shifting sand dunes from covering it, as well as a blue pump house in the distance.

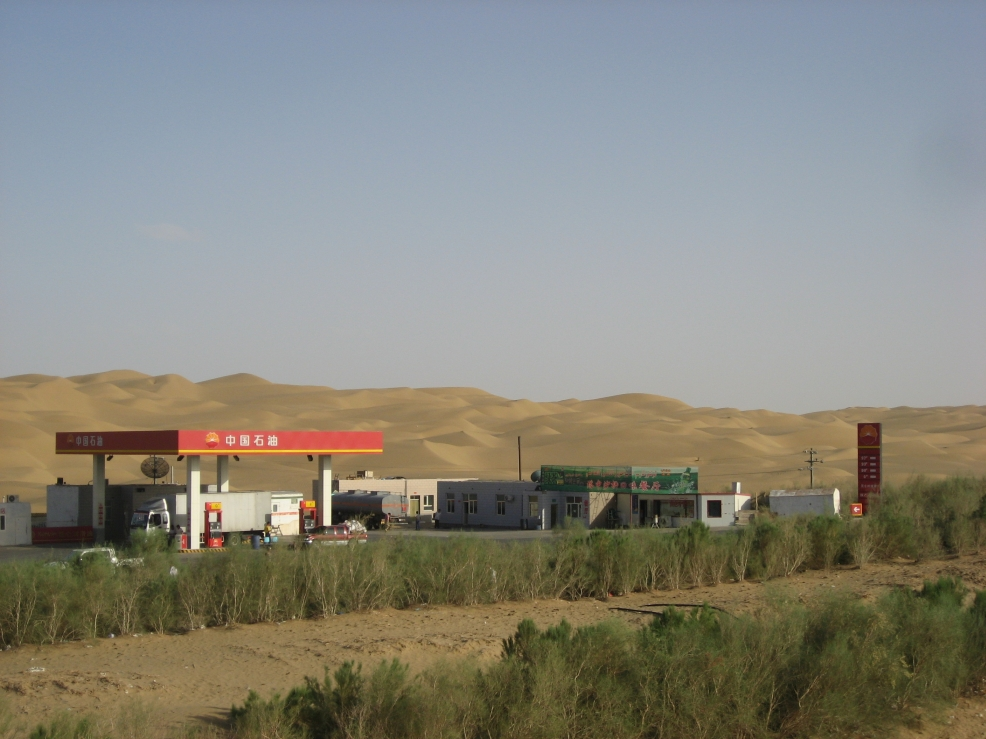
PetroChina gas station on the highway route

The Tarim Desert Highway (Chinese: 塔里木沙漠公路; pinyin: Tǎlǐmù Shāmò Gōnglù), also known as the Cross-Desert Highway (CDH) or Taklamakan Desert Highway, crosses the Taklamakan Desert in China. There are now three highways: two main highways and one branch highway.

== Lunmin Highway ==
The Lunmin Highway links the cities of Luntai (Chinese: 轮台) on National Highway 314 and Minfeng (Chinese: 民丰) on National Highway 315, on the northern and southern edges of the Tarim Basin. The total length of the highway is 552 km (343 mi), approximately 446 km (277 mi) of which crosses uninhabited areas covered by shifting sand dunes, making it the longest such highway in the world.

=== History ===
Construction on the highway began in 1993 because of expansion in the petroleum industry, requiring fast shipping across the Taklamakan desert. Construction was completed in 1995.

=== Maintenance ===
To prevent the shifting sands from covering the highway, bushes and other vegetation were planted next to the highway to anchor the sand with their roots. A massive irrigation system was constructed to pump water for the vegetation along the highway. Every four kilometers along the road there is a maintenance shed for keeping a belt of shrubs along the road irrigated, which protects the road against moving sand.

=== Services ===
At the halfway point along the desert highway, there are a few restaurants and a gas station. Except for pump house maintenance workers, the region is entirely uninhabited.

=== Gallery of Lunmin Highway ===
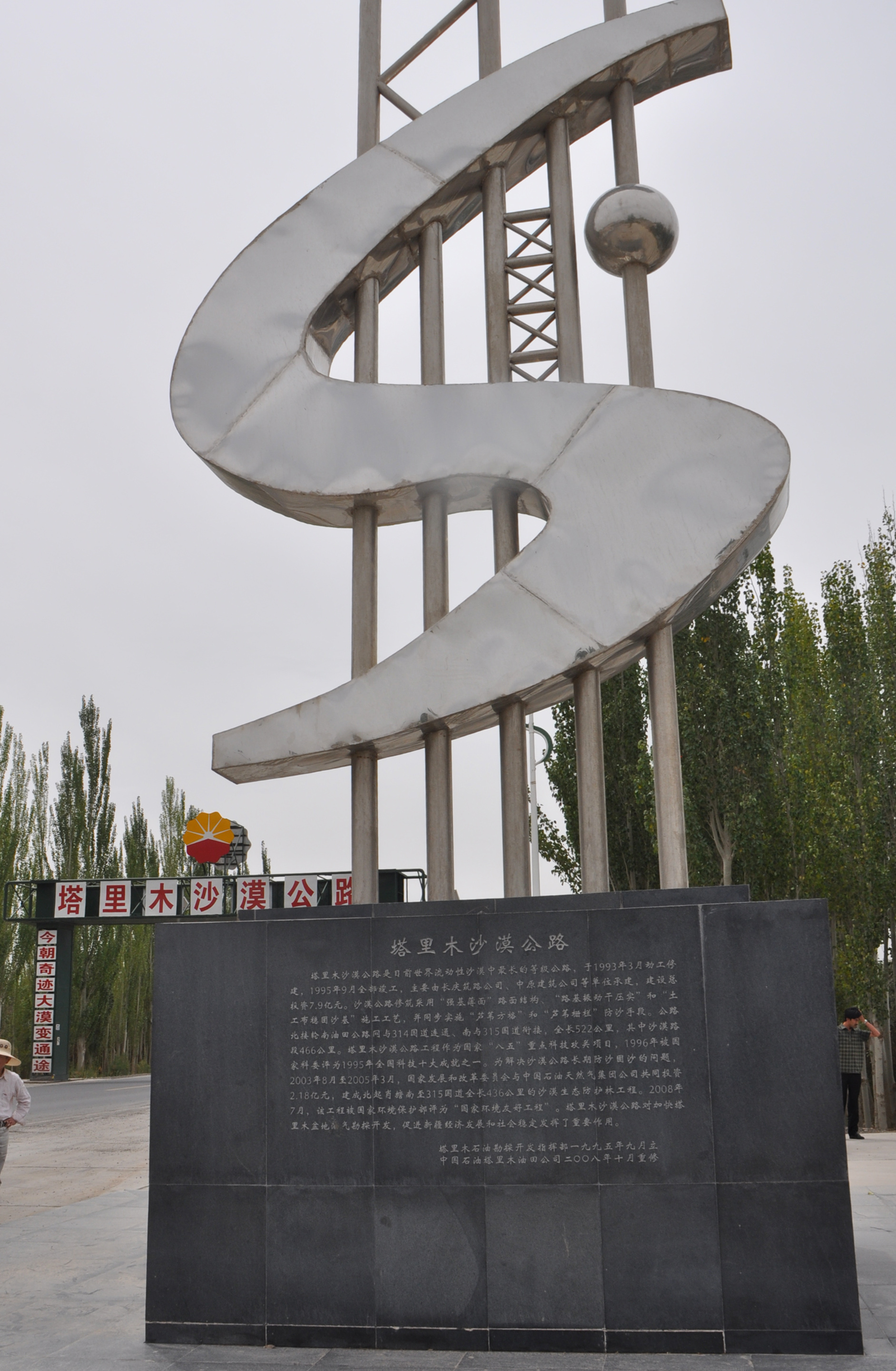
The monument commemorating the completion of the Highway, on the north end (in Luntai County)

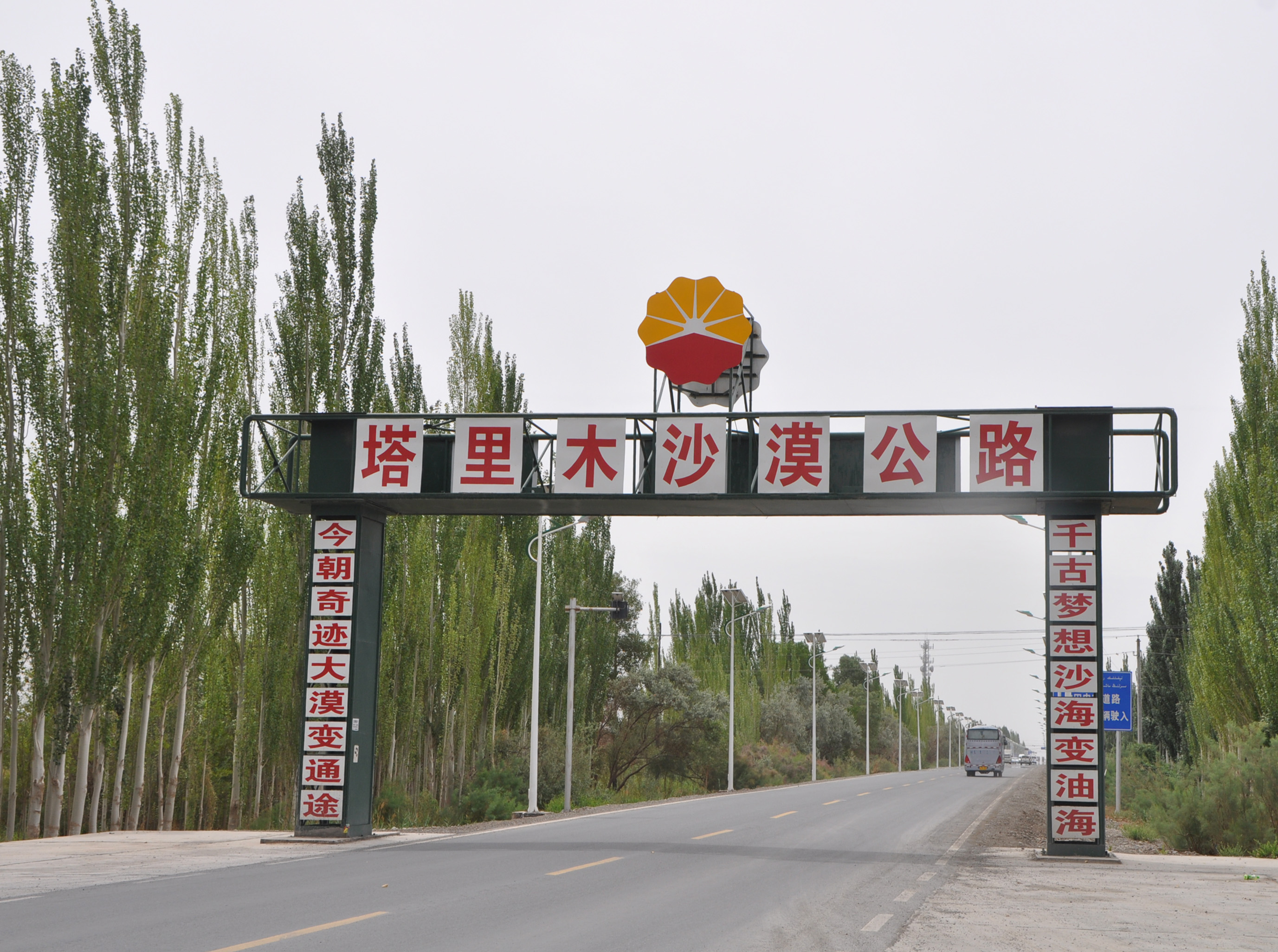
The start of the Highway on the north side (in Luntai County)

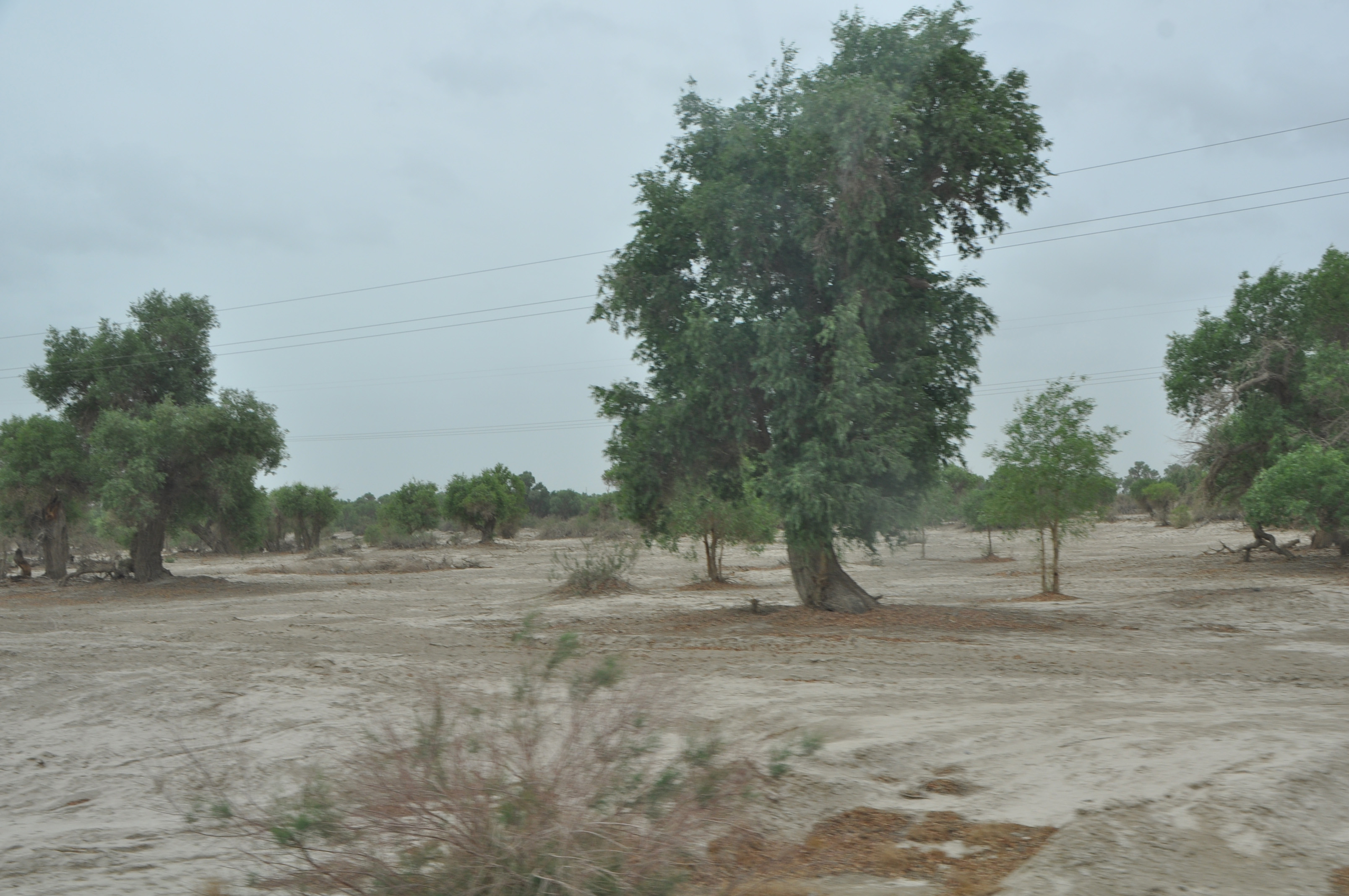
Desert poplars

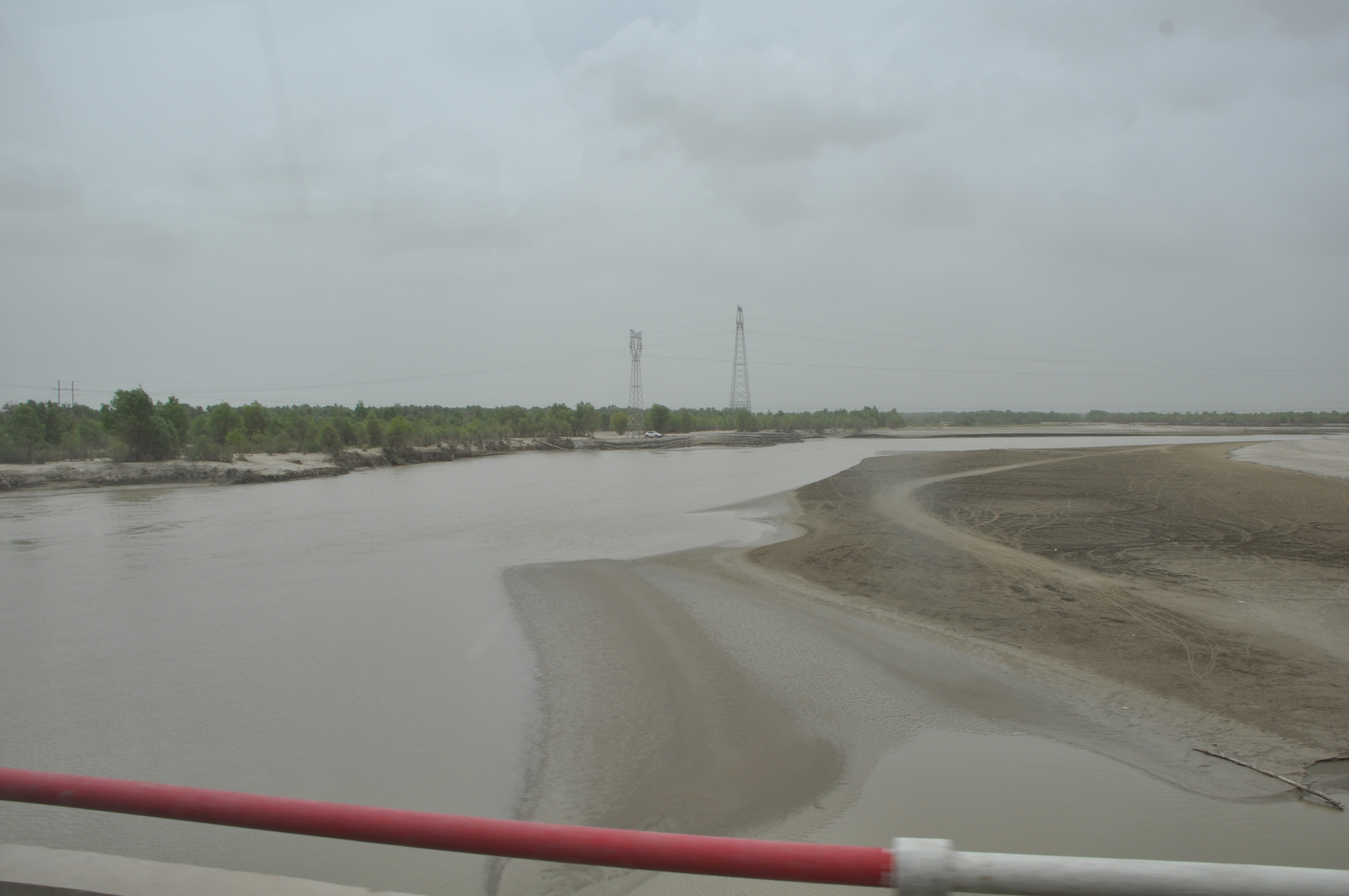
Crossing the Tarim River

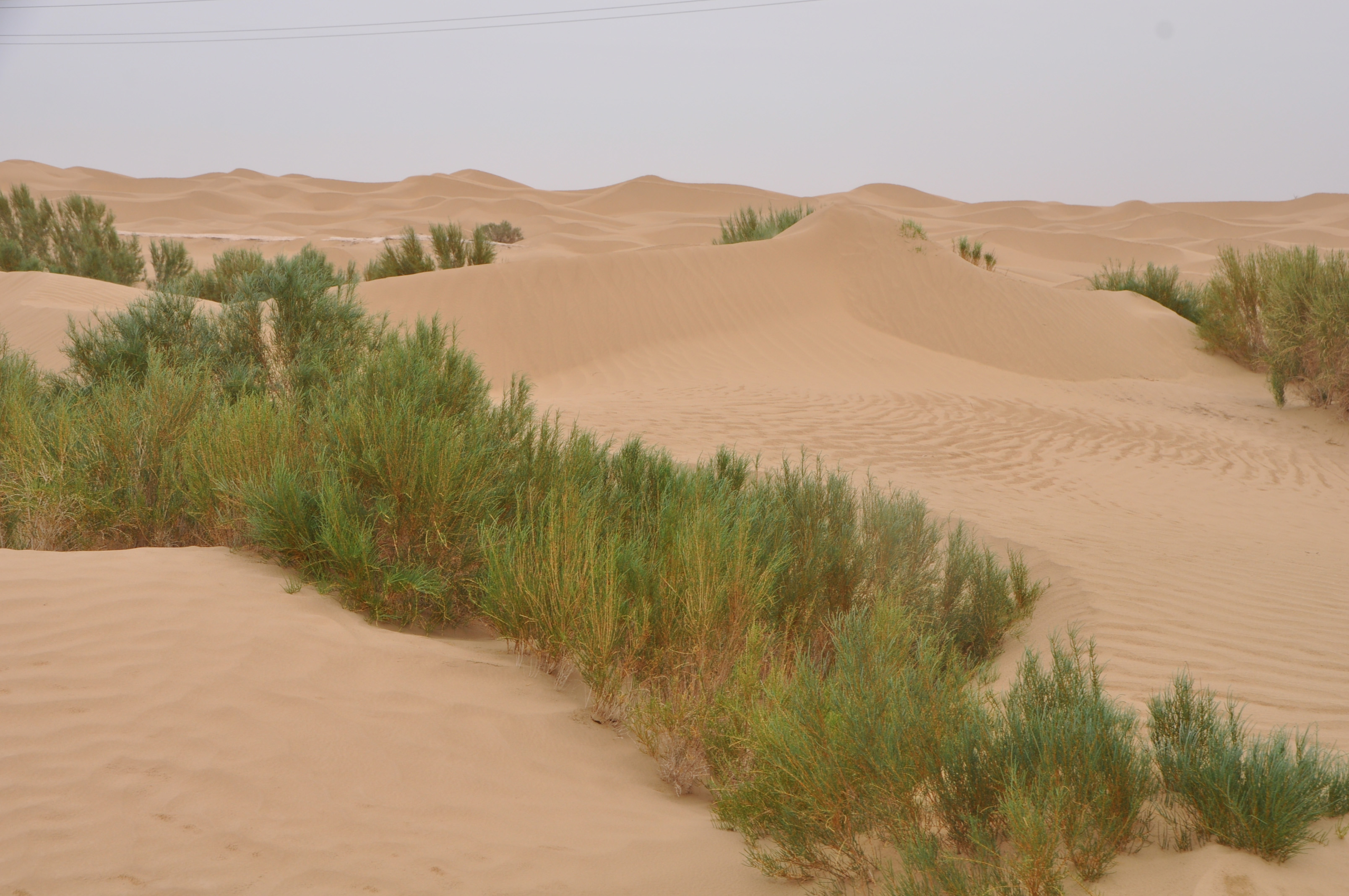
A scene of the Tarim Desert along the way

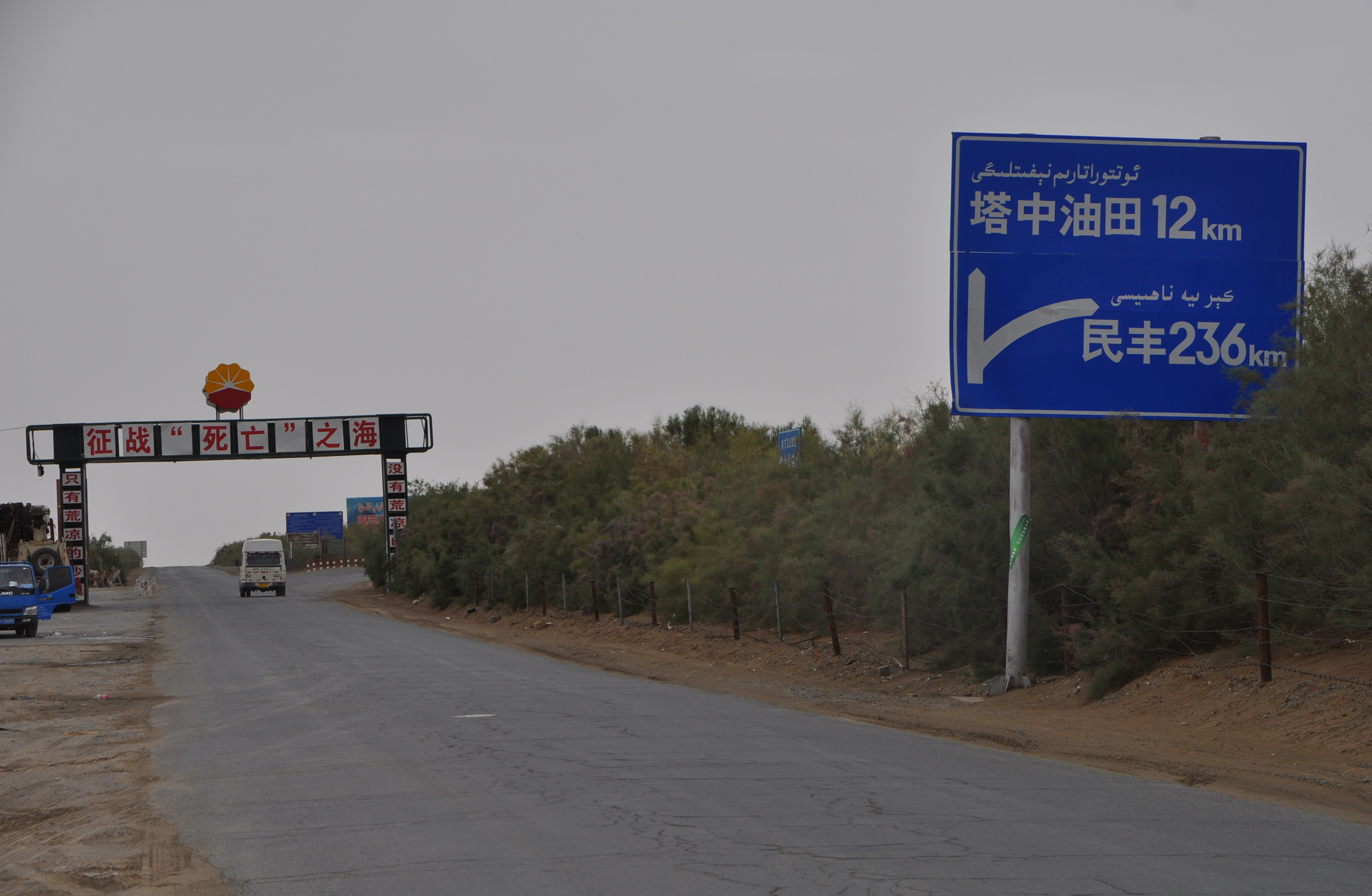
Straight for the branch to Tazhong Oil Field or right on the main highway toward Minfeng County

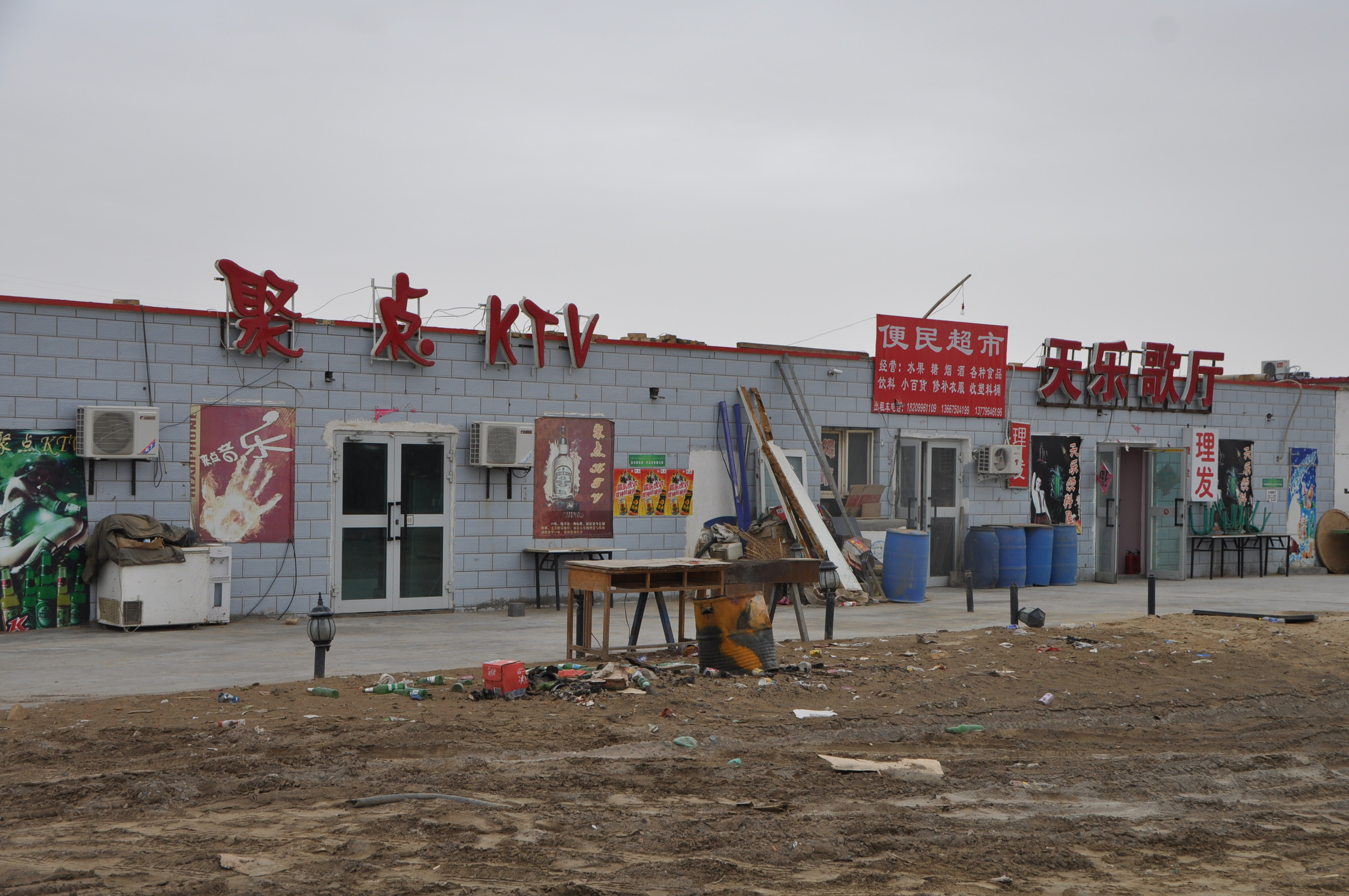
A supermarket and a Karaoke parlor at the junction of Tajie Highway

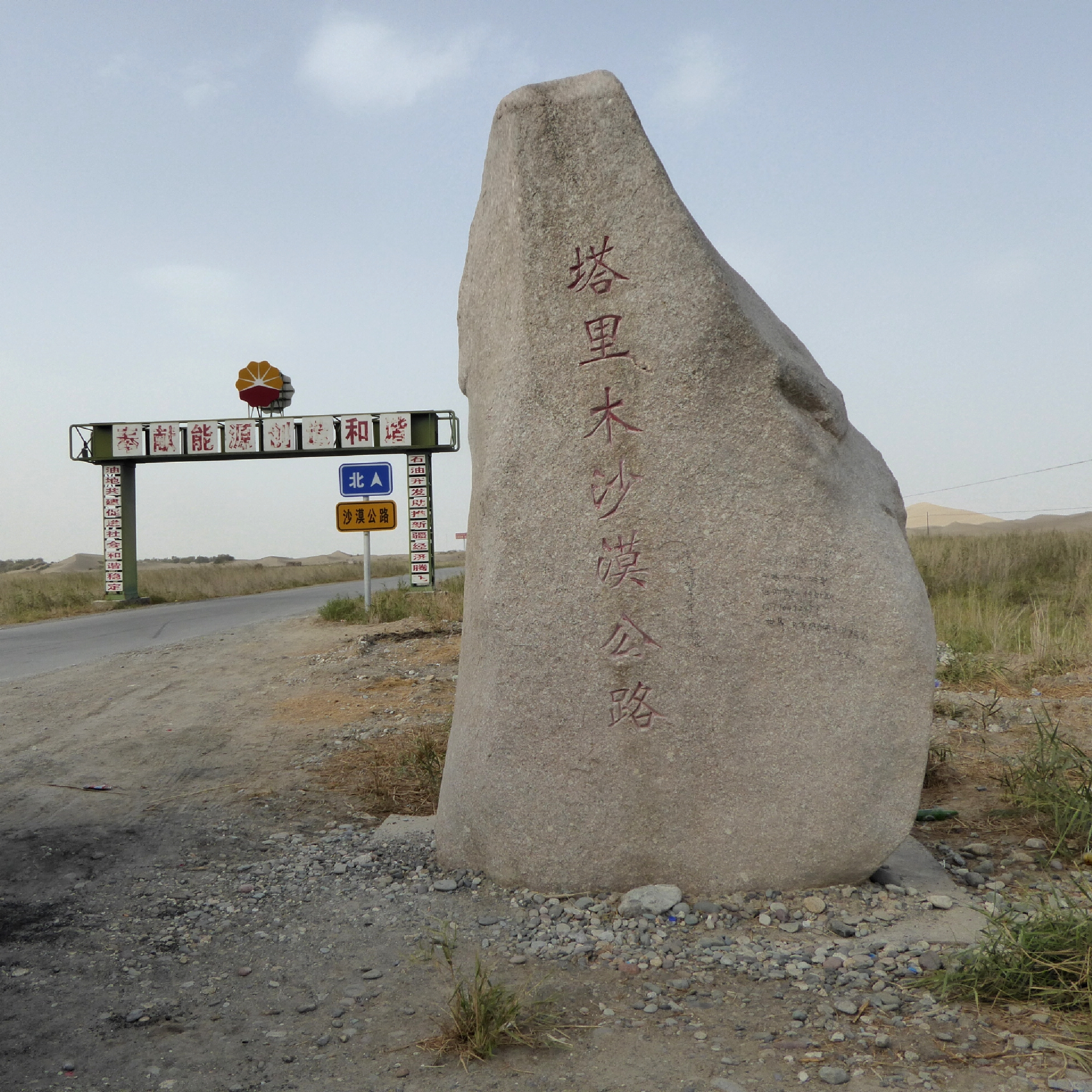
The monument at the south end of the Highway, in Minfeng County

== Taqie Highway ==
The Taqie Highway, 156 km (97 mi) long, is a branch highway, connecting Tazhong (Chinese: 塔中) on the Lunmin Highway, above, with Qiemo (Chinese: 且末) in the southeast direction on National Highway 315. It opened in 2002, and is called the autonomous region's S233 Highway.

== Ahe Highway ==
The Ahe Highway, 424 km (263 mi) long, opened in 2007, starts from Aral (Chinese: 阿拉尔) on National Highway 314, west of the historical town of Kucha (Chinese: 库车), in Aksu Prefecture (Chinese: 阿克苏地区), goes southward along the Hetian River, and ends in Hetian (Chinese: 和田) on National Highway 315.
