= Golmud–Korla railway =

Railway line in China

Overview
- Other name: Geku Railway
- Native name: 格库铁路
- Status: in operation
- Locale: Xinjiang, Qinghai
- Termini: Golmud; Korla
- Connecting lines: Qinghai–Tibet railway

History
- Opened: 2020

Technical
- Line length: 1,214 km (754 mi)

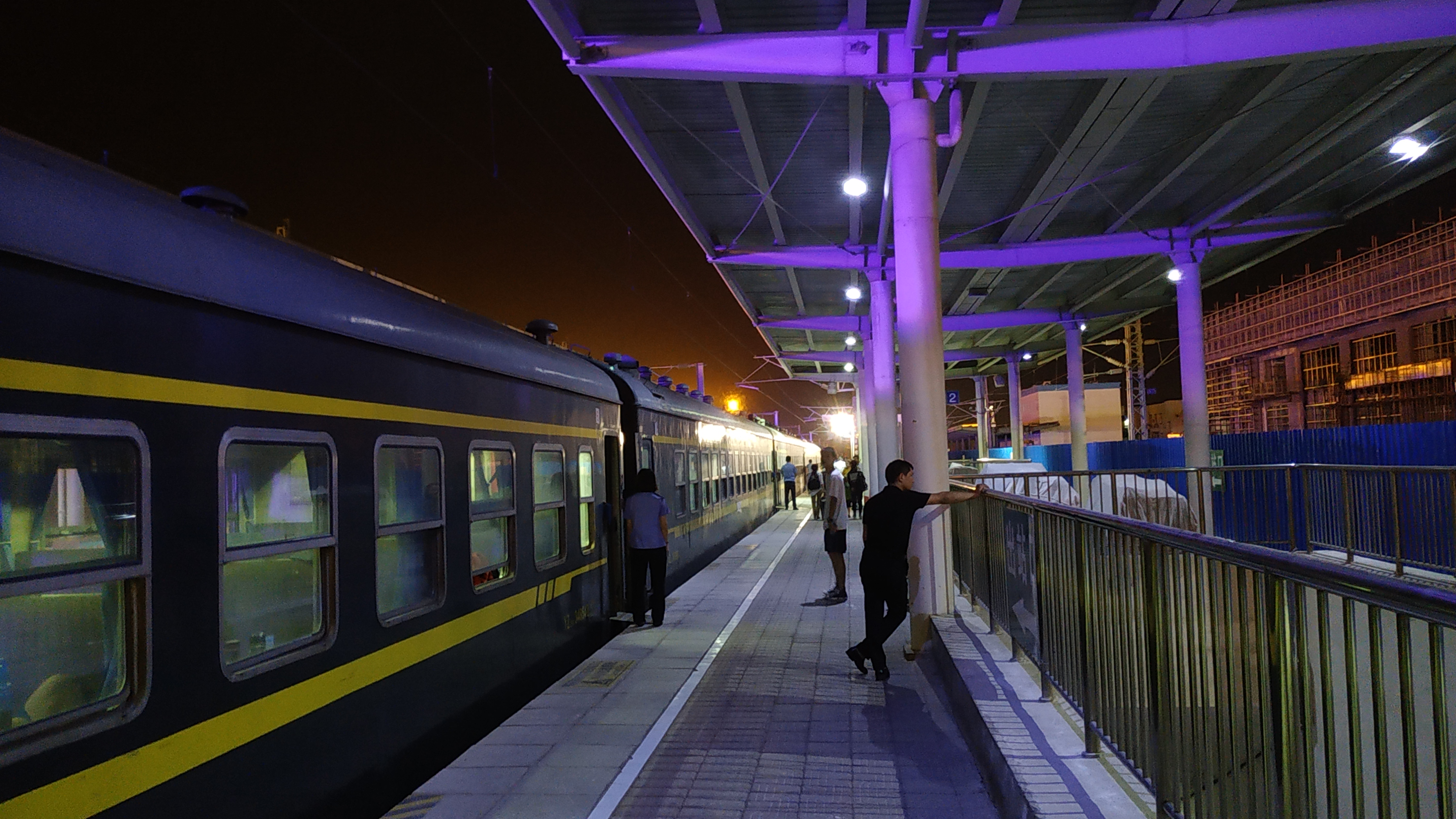

The Geku railway (Chinese: 格库铁路) is a railway connecting Golmud and Korla, in western China. Construction started in November 2014 and was completed in 2020. The length of the line is 1,214 kilometres (754 mi), joining Qinghai Province and Xinjiang Autonomous Region. The investment is estimated to have been CN¥36 billion (~US$6 billion). The line connects the Qinghai–Tibet railway and the Southern Xinjiang railway. It's the third railway connecting Xinjiang with another Chinese subdivision and the third line to Golmud after the Qinghai–Tibet railway and the 2019 Golmud–Dunhuang railway. It is part of the Taklimakan Desert railway loop, together with sections of the Hotan–Ruoqiang railway, Kashgar–Hotan railway, and Southern Xinjiang railway.

== Description ==
The railway crosses the Qaidam Basin, the Altyn-Tagh mountain range, and the Taklamakan Desert. As the third rail artery linking Xinjiang with neighboring provinces, the line cut travel time between the two places from 26 hours to 12 hours.

The railway generally follows the route of Qinghai Provincial Highway 303 (from Golmud to Mangya Lake 茫崖湖), China National Highway 315 (from Mangya Lake to Ruoqiang) and China National Highway 218 (from Ruoqiang to Korla).

A 24.6 km (15.3 mi) long viaduct crosses over the Karakoshun Lake.

The line is used for passenger travel and cargo such as petroleum products.

=== Xinjiang railway loop ===
Combined with the Hotan–Ruoqiang railway along the southern rim of the Tarim Basin (which opened on June 16, 2022), the Kashgar–Hotan railway, the Korla–Kashgar section of the Southern Xinjiang railway, and the Ruoqiang–Korla section of the Golmud–Korla railway, railways now form a 2,712 km (1,685 mi) loop around the Tarim Basin.

== History and development ==
With a design speed of 120 kilometres per hour (75 mph), the Qinghai section of the rail route launched on 30 June 2020 stretching 506.5 kilometres (314.7 mi) and 15 stations, with one pair of passenger trains and two pairs of freight trains per day at launch. The remaining section opened on 9 December 2020.

On 11 October 2021, service frequency between Golmud and Mangyazhen was increased to one train in each direction per day.

== See also ==
- Golmud–Dunhuang railway
- Qinghai–Tibet railway
- Hotan–Ruoqiang railway
