= Moyu railway station =

Rail station in Hotan, China

Moyu Railway Station 墨玉站

General information
- Location: Moyu County, Hotan Prefecture, Xinjiang; China
- Coordinates: 37.222336°N 79.730577°E
- Operator: CR Ürümqi
- Line: Kashgar–Hotan railway

Other information
- Station code: Telegraph code: MUR; Pinyin code: MYU; TMIS code: 43169

History
- Opened: 20 June 2011

Services
Preceding station	China Railway	Following station
224 Tuan towards Kashgar	Kashgar–Hotan railway	Hotan Terminus
Location

Moyu railway station (Chinese: 墨玉站; pinyin: Mòyù zhàn) is a railway station in Moyu County along the Kashgar–Hotan railway. It was opened on 20 June 2011. It is operated by China Railway Ürümqi Group.

== History ==
The station was built in 2010.
