= Molcha River =

River in Xinjiang, China

Coordinates: 37°12′06″N 84°27′33″E

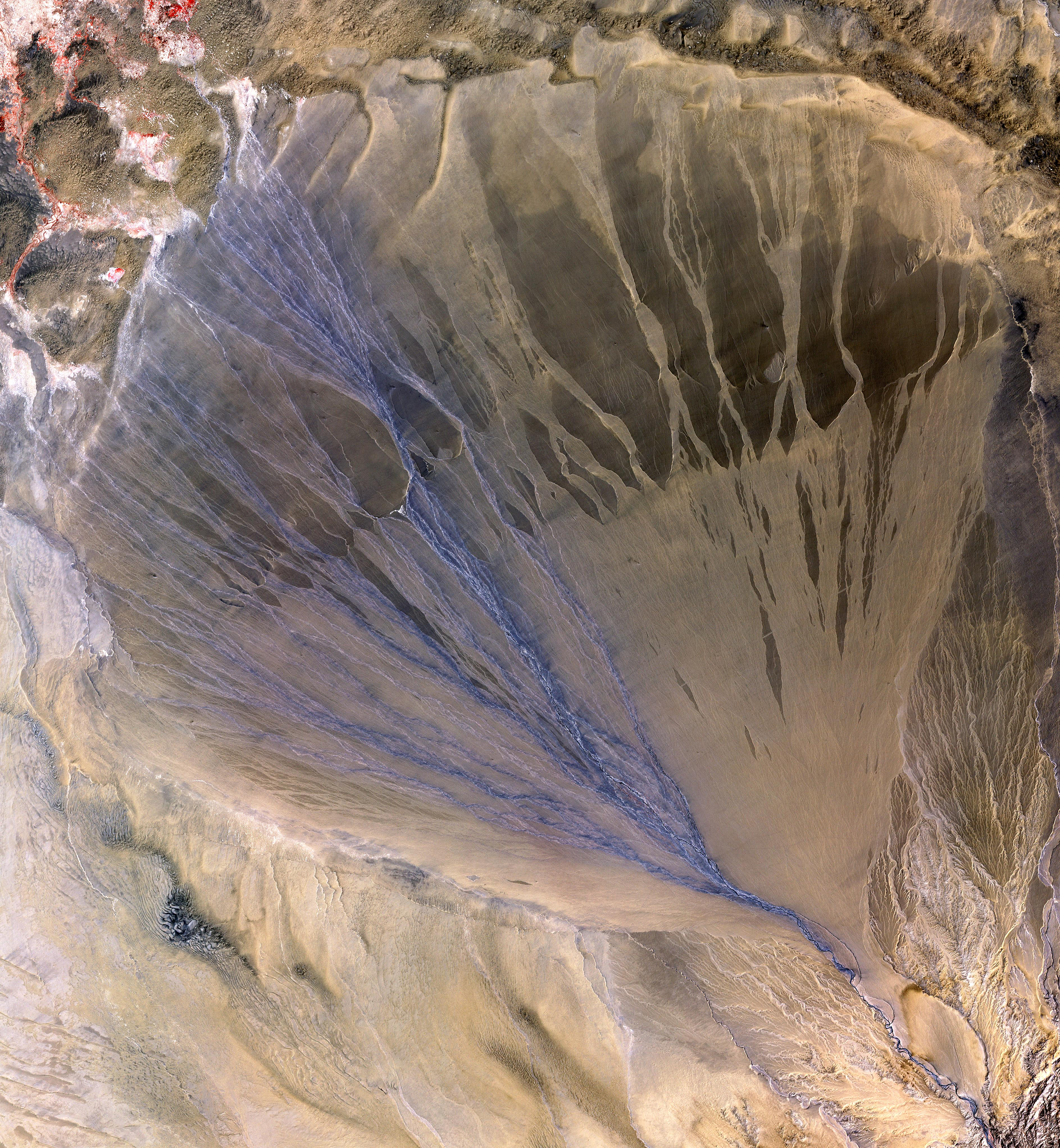
Molcha River alluvial fan; the left side appears blue from water flowing in many streams.

The Molcha River (Uyghur: مولچى دەرياسى, Молча деряси; Chinese: 莫勒切河; pinyin: Mòlèqiē Hé) forms a vast alluvial fan at the southern border of the Taklamakan Desert, as it leaves the Altyn-Tagh mountains and enters the desert in the western part of Qiemo County. The left side of the satellite photograph appears blue from water flowing in many streams. Around May, the river is filled with snow/glacier meltwater.
