= Tazhong =

Tazhong 塔中镇
- Town
- Tazhong Town
- Interactive map of Tazhong
- Location within Bayingolin Location within Xinjiang Location within China
- Coordinates: 39°00′36″N 83°36′36″E
- Country: China
- Autonomous region: Xinjiang
- Autonomous prefecture: Bayin'gholin Mongol Autonomous Prefecture
- County: Qiemo County

Tazhong (Chinese: 塔中镇; Pinyin tǎ zhōng zhèn) is a town in Qiemo County, Bayingolin Mongol Autonomous Prefecture, Xinjiang. Tazhong administers one community: Tazhong Community (Chinese: 塔中虚拟社区). Tazhong was created on July 24, 2015. The population is typically around 20,000, 90% of which are temporary residents.

== Geography ==
Tazhong is located in centre of the Taklamakan Desert.

== Climate ==
Climate data for Tazhong, elevation 1,099 m (3,606 ft), (1991–2020 normals, extremes 1981–2010)
Month	Jan	Feb	Mar	Apr	May	Jun	Jul	Aug	Sep	Oct	Nov	Dec	Year
Record high °C (°F)	16.3 (61.3)	17.2 (63.0)	32.7 (90.9)	37.0 (98.6)	38.2 (100.8)	41.6 (106.9)	45.6 (114.1)	42.7 (108.9)	39.5 (103.1)	31.9 (89.4)	24.7 (76.5)	16.7 (62.1)	45.6 (114.1)
Mean daily maximum °C (°F)	−0.4 (31.3)	7.0 (44.6)	17.5 (63.5)	25.6 (78.1)	30.5 (86.9)	34.3 (93.7)	36.3 (97.3)	35.5 (95.9)	30.4 (86.7)	22.2 (72.0)	11.0 (51.8)	1.3 (34.3)	20.9 (69.7)
Daily mean °C (°F)	−10.0 (14.0)	−2.5 (27.5)	8.0 (46.4)	16.5 (61.7)	21.9 (71.4)	26.3 (79.3)	28.3 (82.9)	27.3 (81.1)	21.3 (70.3)	11.4 (52.5)	0.2 (32.4)	−8.5 (16.7)	11.7 (53.0)
Mean daily minimum °C (°F)	−18.3 (−0.9)	−11.9 (10.6)	−2.0 (28.4)	6.9 (44.4)	12.7 (54.9)	17.8 (64.0)	20.0 (68.0)	18.7 (65.7)	11.7 (53.1)	1.1 (34.0)	−8.6 (16.5)	−16.2 (2.8)	2.7 (36.8)
Record low °C (°F)	−32.6 (−26.7)	−32.7 (−26.9)	−12.3 (9.9)	−8.3 (17.1)	1.2 (34.2)	7.2 (45.0)	11.1 (52.0)	6.8 (44.2)	0.6 (33.1)	−8.4 (16.9)	−18.0 (−0.4)	−24.7 (−12.5)	−32.7 (−26.9)
Average precipitation mm (inches)	0.5 (0.02)	0.4 (0.02)	0.2 (0.01)	0.7 (0.03)	3.7 (0.15)	9.8 (0.39)	5.4 (0.21)	3.5 (0.14)	0.7 (0.03)	0.7 (0.03)	0.1 (0.00)	0.1 (0.00)	25.8 (1.03)
Average precipitation days (≥ 0.1 mm)	0.8	0.3	0.3	0.3	1.8	3.5	3.5	1.8	0.8	0.4	0.1	0.6	14.2
Average snowy days	2.7	1.1	0	0	0	0	0	0	0	0	0.3	2.8	6.9
Average relative humidity (%)	55	40	23	20	24	29	30	28	29	34	45	56	34
Mean monthly sunshine hours	188.5	191.2	220.7	222.0	251.4	240.6	246.8	246.3	253.9	262.7	216.9	184.1	2,725.1
Percentage possible sunshine	62	62	59	55	56	54	55	59	69	78	73	63	62
Source: China Meteorological Administration

== Economy ==
The petroleum industry makes up most of the economy of Tazhong. There are more than 100 oilfield units and engineering construction units such as PetroChina Tarim Oilfield Branch, Sinopec Northwest Oilfield Branch, Daqing Oilfield Tadong Company, and nearly 100 various commercial outlets in the area of Tazhong. Other than petroleum, the service and tourism industry also support Tazhong.

== Transport ==
Tarim Desert Highway runs through Tazhong.

== See also ==
- List of township-level divisions of Xinjiang
