= Kashgar–Hotan railway =

Railway in Xinjiang, China

Overview
- Locale: Xinjiang, China
- Termini: Kashgar; Hotan
- Continues from: Southern Xinjiang railway
- Continues as: Hotan–Ruoqiang railway

History
- Opened: 2010 (cargo); 2011 (passenger)
Route map
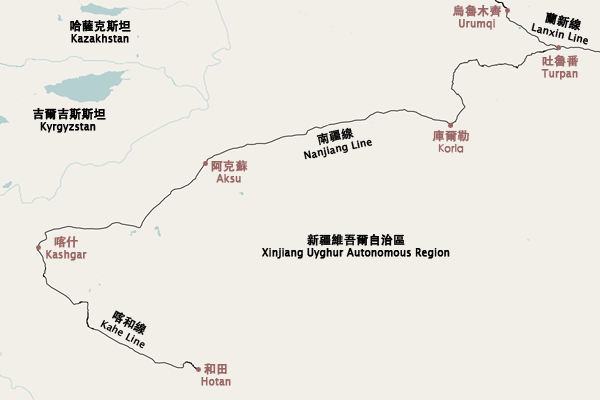

The Kashgar–Hotan railway or Kahe railway (Chinese: 喀什至和田铁路; pinyin: Kāshí zhì Hétián Tiělù, abbreviated Chinese: 喀和铁路; pinyin: Kā-Hé Tiělù), is a single-track, non-electrified, railway in Xinjiang, China between Kashgar and Hotan. The railway is 488.27 km (303.40 mi) in length and runs along the southern edge of the Taklamakan Desert, connecting all major cities and towns of the Southwestern Tarim Basin, including Shule, Akto, Yengisar, Yarkant (Shache), Poskam (Zepu), Karghilik (Yecheng), Pishan (Guma) and Karakax (Moyu). The line extends the Southern Xinjiang Railway south from Kashgar. Construction began in December 2008. The line opened to freight traffic on December 30, 2010. Passenger service began on June 28, 2011. Beyond Hotan, it continues as the Hotan–Ruoqiang railway.

It forms the Taklamakan Desert railway loop, together with sections of the Hotan–Ruoqiang railway, Southern Xinjiang railway, and Golmud–Korla railway. The proposed Khunjerab Railway, a part of the China–Pakistan Economic Corridor, would one day link to the Kashgar–Hotan railway, allowing Islamabad, Pakistan to directly connect to Hotan and the Chinese railway network.

== Station list ==
| Station | Chinese | Distance (km^{2}) | Location | |
|---|---|---|---|---|
| Kashi^{Southern Xinjiang railway} | 喀什 | 0 | Kashi | Kashgar / Kashi Prefecture |
| Shule | 疏勒 | 14 | Shule County | Kashgar / Kashi Prefecture |
| Akto | 阿克陶 | 38 | Akto County | Kizilsu Prefecture |
| Yengisar | 英吉沙 | 66 | Yengisar County | Kashgar / Kashi Prefecture |
| Kezile | 克孜勒 | | Yengisar County | Kashgar / Kashi Prefecture |
| Mayake | 马牙克 | | Yengisar County | Kashgar / Kashi Prefecture |
| Tuoluolake | 托洛拉克 | | Shache County | Kashgar / Kashi Prefecture |
| Shache | 莎车 | 187 | Shache County | Kashgar / Kashi Prefecture |
| Zepu | 泽普 | | Poskam County | Kashgar / Kashi Prefecture |
| Yecheng | 叶城 | 246 | Yecheng County | Kashgar / Kashi Prefecture |
| Kuoshan | 阔什 | | Guma / Pishan County | Hotan Prefecture |
| Pishan | 皮山 | 327 | Guma / Pishan County | Hotan Prefecture |
| Zanggui | 藏桂 | | Guma / Pishan County | Hotan Prefecture |
| 224 Tuan | 二二四团 | | Karakax / Moyu County | Hotan Prefecture |
| Moyu | 墨玉 | 468 | Karakax / Moyu County | Hotan Prefecture |
| Hotan^{Hotan–Ruoqiang railway} | 和田 | 485 | Hotan | Hotan Prefecture |

== See also ==
- List of railways in China
