= Kashgar railway station =

Main railway station of Kashgar, Xinjiang, China

Kashi [Kashgar] 喀什
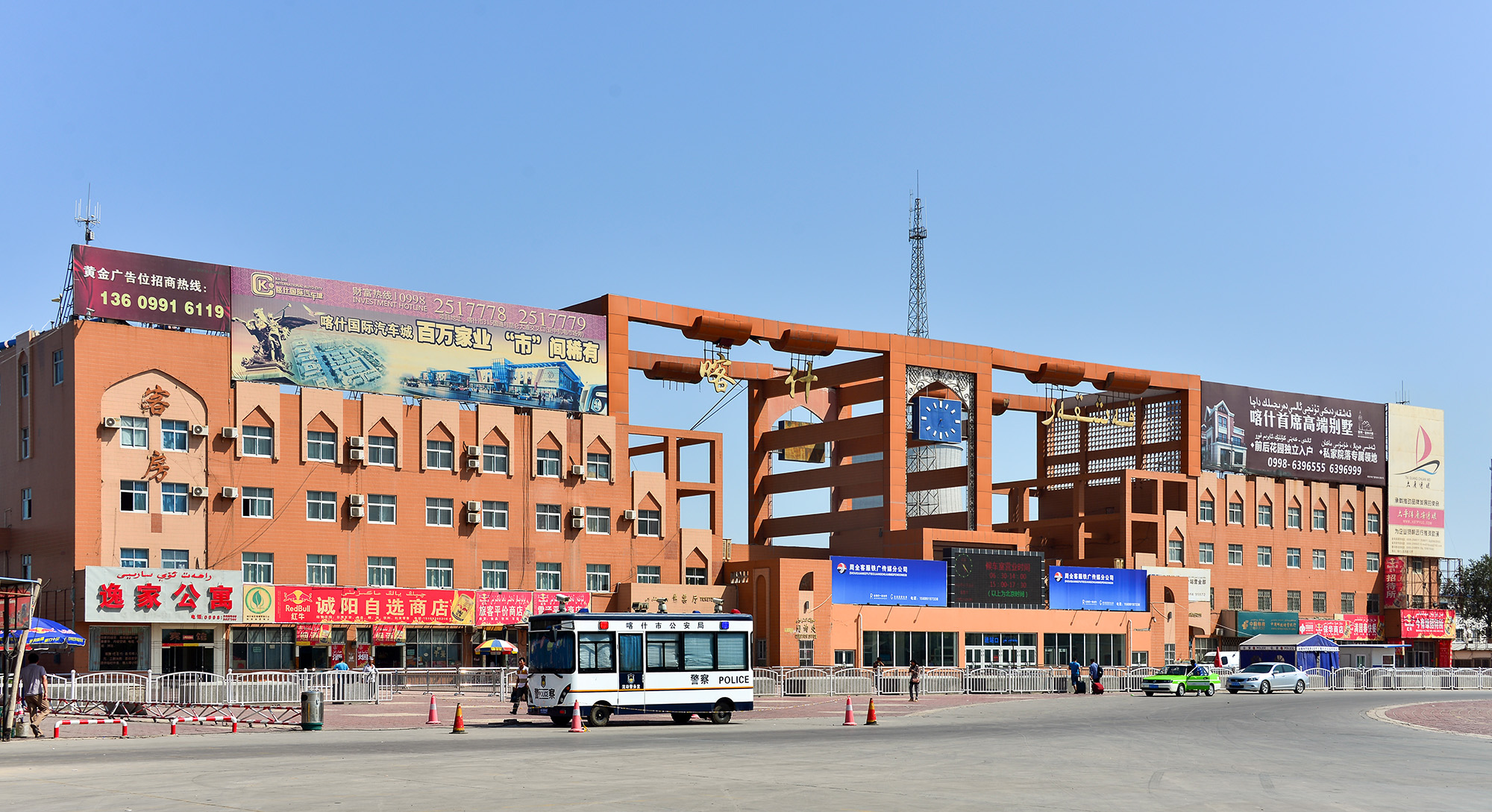

General information
- Location: Kashgar, Kashgar Prefecture, Xinjiang; China
- Coordinates: 39°29′31″N 76°02′46″E
- Line(s): Southern Xinjiang Railway; Kashgar–Hotan Railway
- Platforms: 1

History
- Opened: 1999

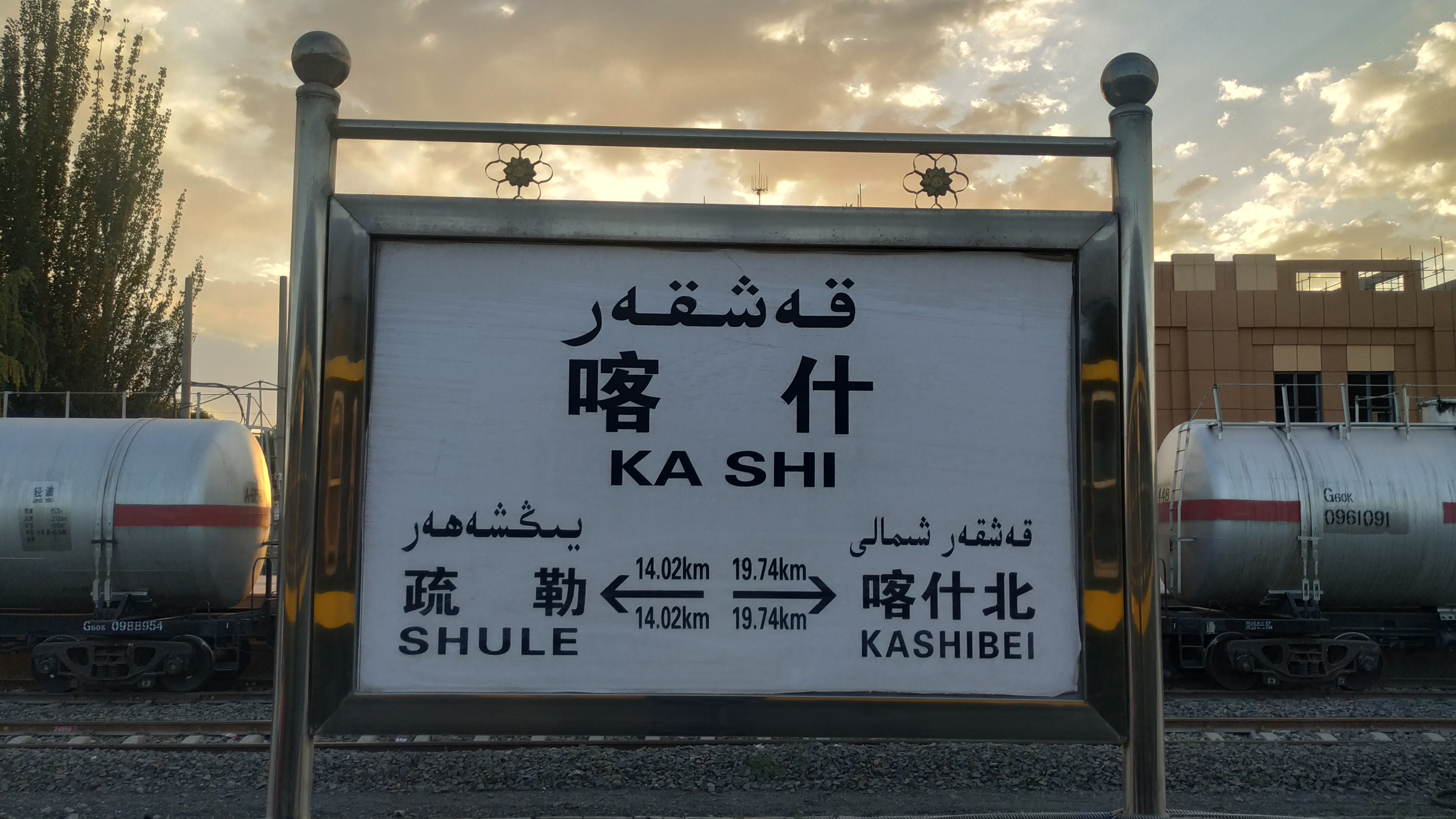

Kashgar railway station (喀什站) is the main railway station of Kashgar, Xinjiang and the westernmost railway station in China. It is the western terminus for the Southern Xinjiang and Kashgar–Hotan Railways.

The station is located northeast of the city of Kashgar and is served by regular passenger trains to Ürümqi via Turpan. A trip on the faster kind (K-series) takes under 22 hours from Kashgar to Turpan or just over 24 hours to Ürümqi.

== History ==
The station opened in 1999.

Preceding station	China Railway	Following station
Artux towards Turpan	Southern Xinjiang railway	Terminus
Terminus	Kashgar–Hotan railway	Shule towards Hotan
