= Turpan railway station =

Railway station in Turpan, China

Coordinates: 43°9′6.55″N 88°52′29.6″E

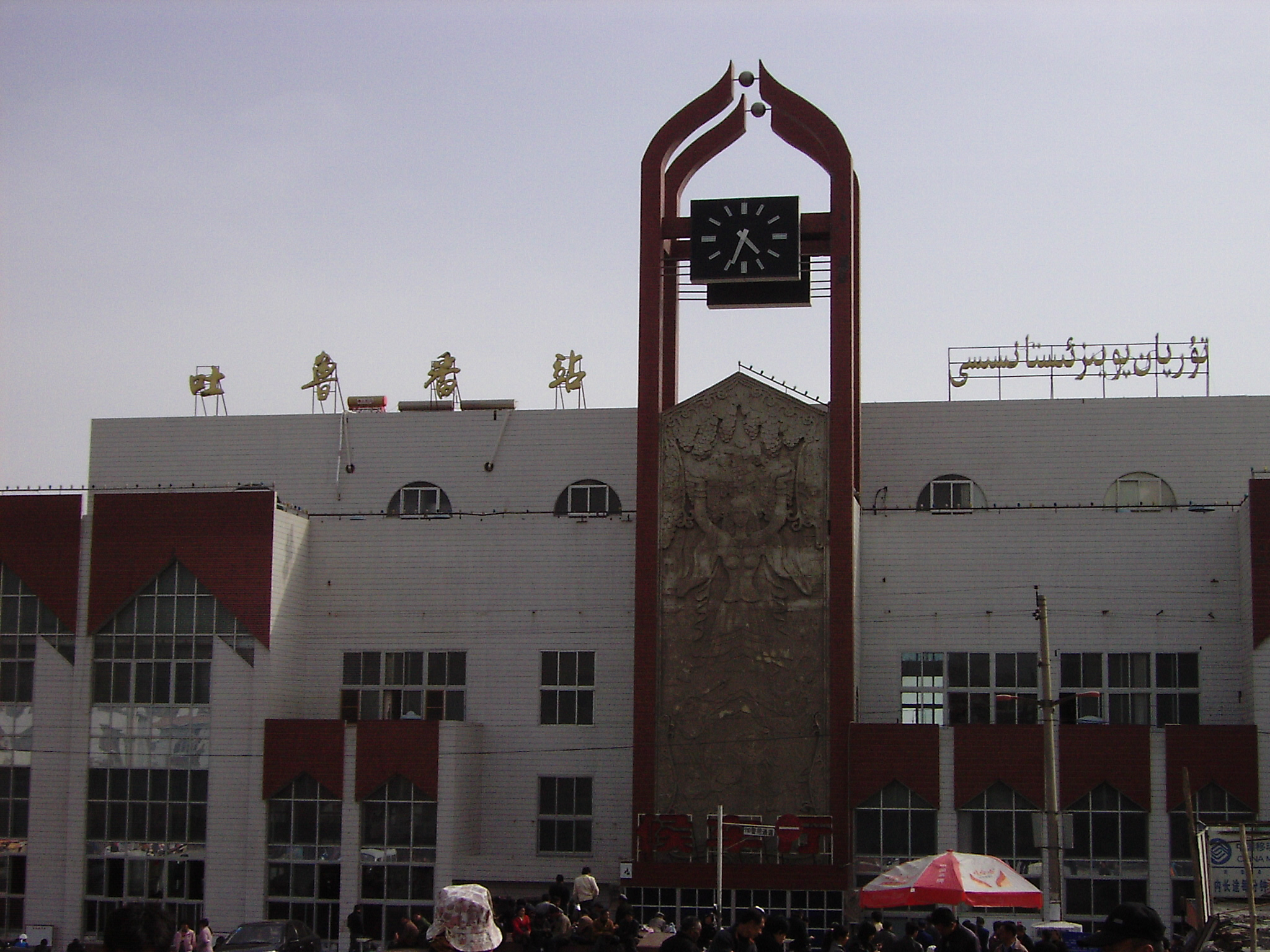
Turpan railway station, Xinjiang, China

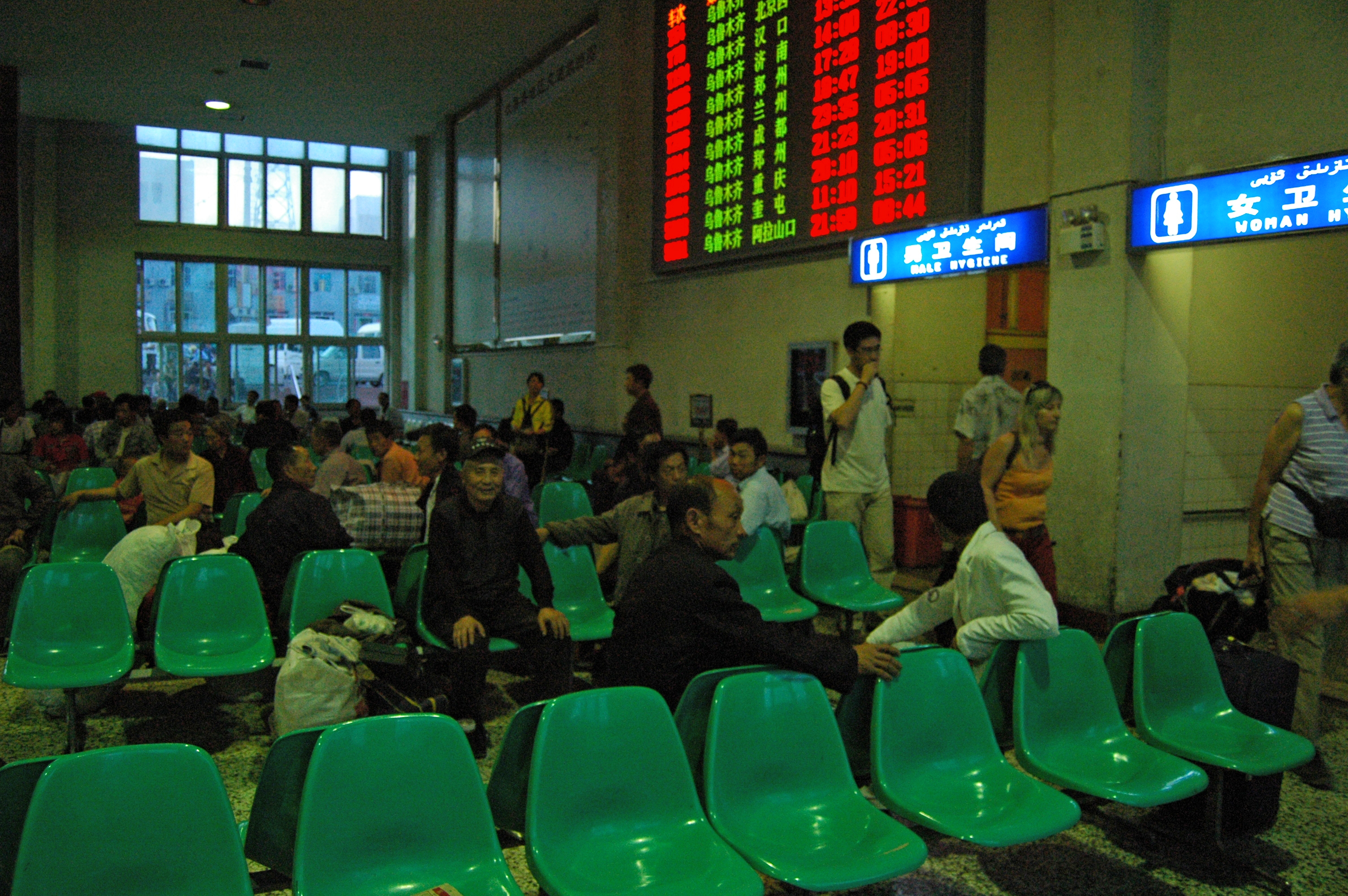
The waiting room at Turpan railway station (ca.2008)

Turpan railway station (Chinese: 吐鲁番站) is the main railway station of the conventional lines in Turpan, the second largest city in Xinjiang, China.

== General ==
Turpan railway station opened in 1961 when the Lanzhou–Xinjiang railway was extended via Turpan to Urumqi. In 1984, the Southern Xinjiang railway was laid from Turpan to Korla railway station in Korla.

== See also ==
- Transportation of Turpan
- Turpan North railway station
