= Hotan–Ruoqiang railway =

Chinese train line

Hotan–Ruoqiang (Qakilik) railway
- Location of the railway in Xinjiang, China

Overview
- Native name: 和若铁路
- Status: Operational
- Termini: Hotan; Ruoqiang (Qakilik)
- Continues from: Kashgar–Hotan railway
- Connecting lines: Golmud–Korla railway

Service
- Type: Heavy rail

History
- Opened: 2022

Technical
- Line length: 825.5 km (513 mi)
- Track gauge: 1,435 mm (4 ft 8 1/2 in) standard gauge
- Operating speed: 120 km/h (75 mph)

The Hotan–Ruoqiang (Qakilik) railway or Heruo Railway (Chinese: 和若铁路) is a 825.5 km long railway line connecting the cities of Hotan and Ruoqiang in southern Xinjiang, China that opened on 16 June 2022 with a design speed of 120 kilometres per hour (75 mph). It serves over 10 million people with 20 new stations. Heruo Railway is part of the Taklimakan Desert railway loop, together with sections of the Southern Xinjiang railway, Kashgar–Hotan railway, and Golmud–Korla railway.

== History ==
Construction on the line began in December 2018. Tracklaying began in May 2020 and by April 2021, over half the track had been laid. On 27 September 2021, the construction of the track was fully completed with the laying of the last length of track. Rail welding was completed on 28 October 2021, with track bed tamping and fine adjustment of the line required before scheduled opening of the entire line in 2022.

On March 12, 2022, the Hotan–Ruoqiang railway passed its dynamic acceptance inspection. On June 15, ticket sales for the railway officially began, and on June 16, the line formally commenced operations.

== Route ==
The line is 825.5 kilometres (512.9 mi) long and runs from west to east. In Hotan it continues as the Kashgar–Hotan railway and in Qakilik (Ruoqiang), Ruoqiang (Qakilik) County it branches off the Golmud–Korla railway. Together with those railways it forms a 2,712 km (1,685 mi) loop around the west of the Tarim Basin, linking Hotan, Lop, Qira, Yutian, Minfeng, Qiemo and Bayingolin.

The route includes five viaducts over the sand with a combined length of 49.7 km (30.9 mi), designed to allow sandstorms to blow under them. 434 bridge piers were factory-built and assembled on site. The longest is Niya River Grand Bridge, which has a total length of 18,628.46 metres (61,117 ft 0 in). Further protection against sand has been provided by putting about 13 million shrubs, such as sacsaoul and sea buckthorn, into 5,000 ha (12,000 acres) of grass grids (straw-edged rectangles of about a metre square).
