= Hotan railway station =

Rail station in Hotan, China

Hetian Railway Station 和田站
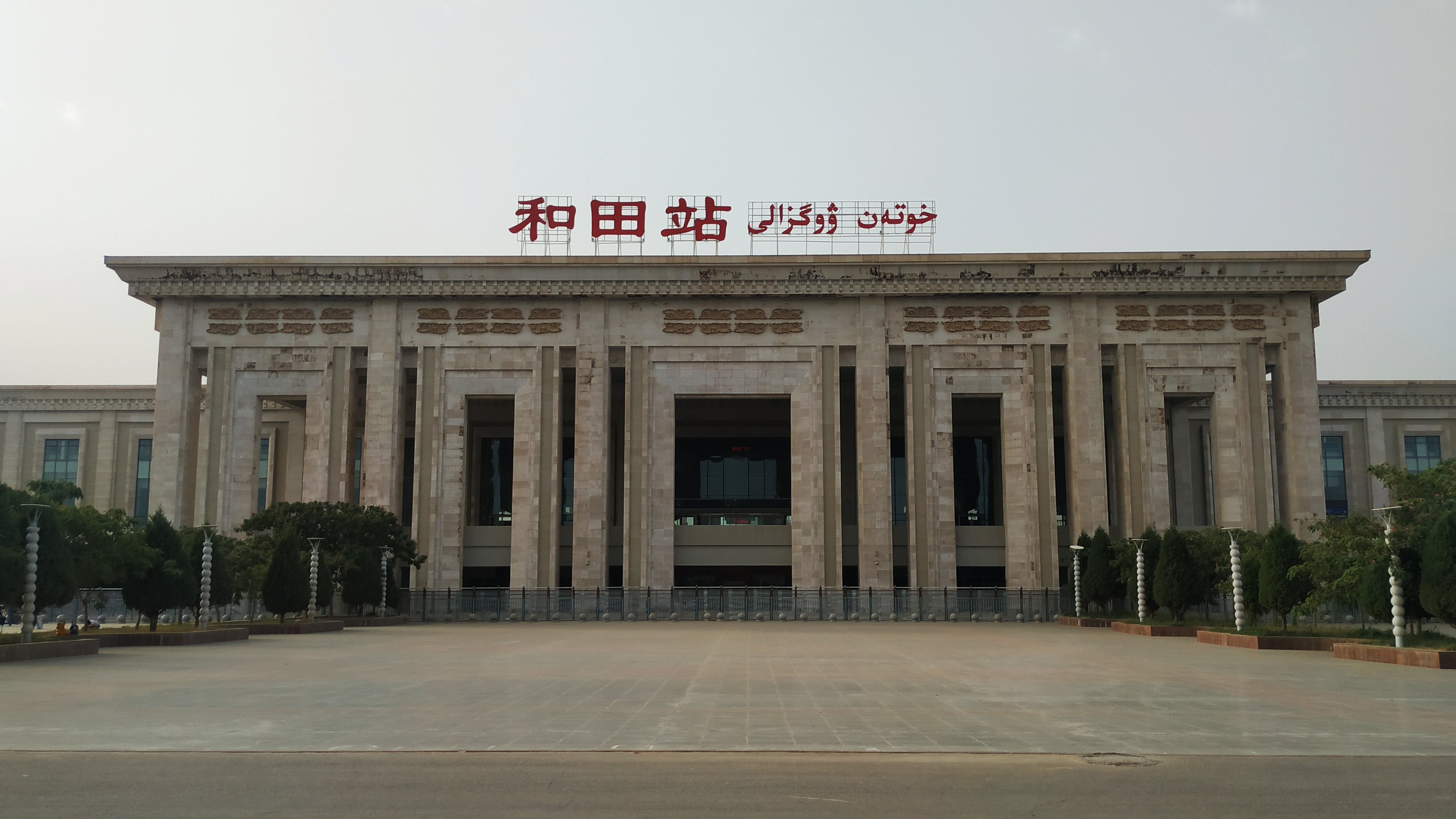
- Hotan railway station in July 2019

General information
- Location: China
- Coordinates: 37.1589°N 79.9048°E
- Operator: CR Ürümqi
- Lines: Kashgar–Hotan railway; Hotan–Ruoqiang railway
- Platforms: 3

Other information
- Station code: Telegraph code: VTR; Pinyin code: HTI; TMIS code: 43172
- Classification: 1st class station

History
- Opened: 28 June 2011

Services
Preceding station	China Railway	Following station
Moyu towards Kashgar	Kashgar–Hotan railway	Terminus
Location

Hotan railway station (Chinese: 和田站; pinyin: Hétián zhàn) is a passenger railway station in Hotan, and is the main railway station of Hotan. It opened in 2011.

== History ==
The station was completed on 28 June 2011. The station temporarily closed on 12 February 2014 due to the 2014 Yutian earthquake.

== Architecture ==
The station building of Hotan Station has a modern and elegant shape. The outer wall is made of white granite. The front facade has white granite reliefs. The overall design fully reflects Hotan jade culture. The facade of the station building has a convex design. The main building has 3 floors. From bottom to top, there is the plaza floor, the platform floor, and the elevated floor. There are ticket halls and VIP halls on both sides, and there is a bridge in front of the station building for easy entry into the station the waiting hall.

== Services ==
=== China Railway ===
Group	Train Number	To
Lanzhou Group	K4092/3	Lanzhou
Ürümqi Group	7558/5	Ürümqi
Ürümqi Group	K6738/5	Ürümqi
Ürümqi Group	5810	Kashgar
Ürümqi Group	T9528/5	Ürümqi
Ürümqi Group	Y964/1	Ürümqi
Ürümqi Group	K9720/17	Yining
