= Southern Xinjiang railway =

Railway line in China

Southern Xinjiang railway 南疆铁路
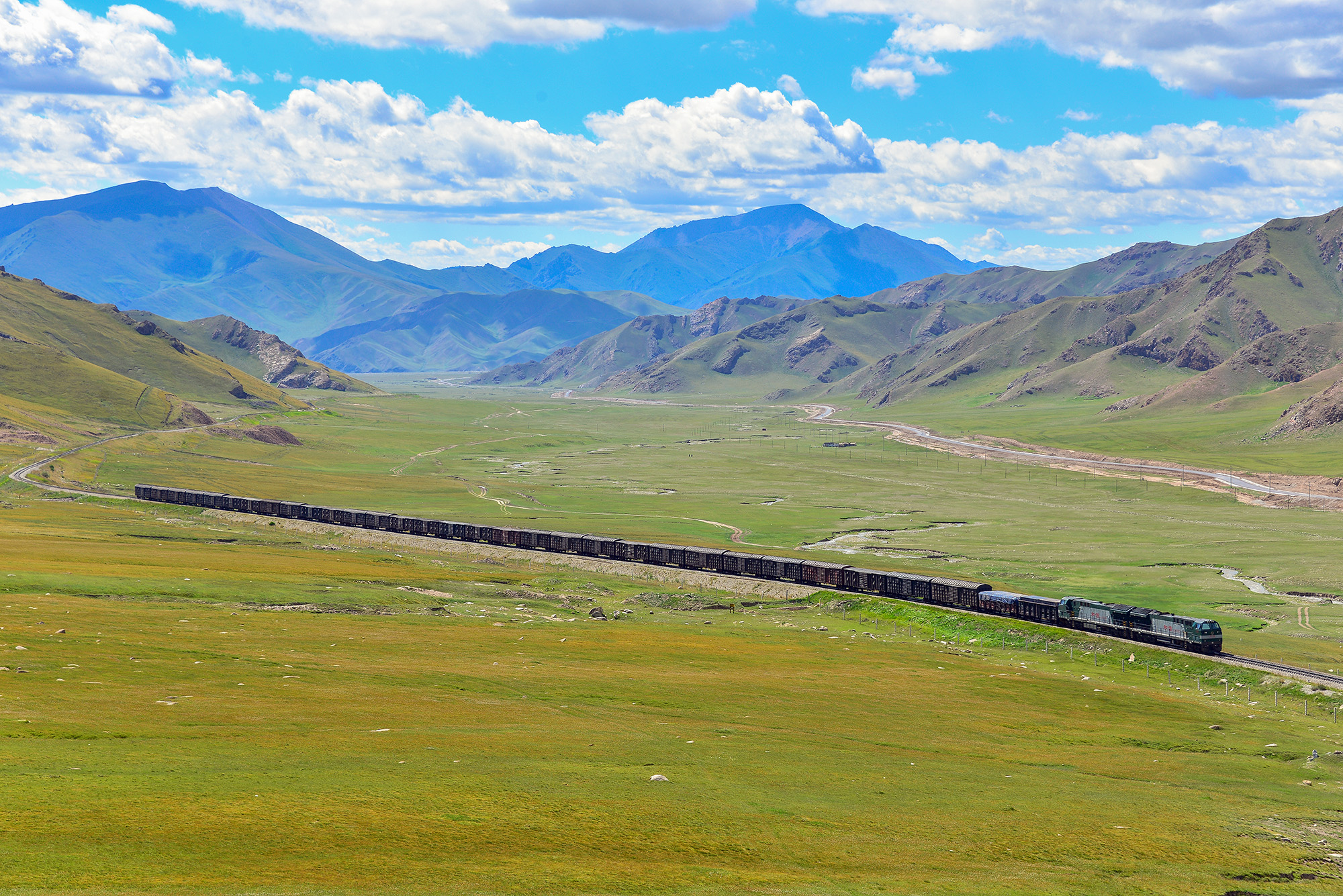
- The Southern Xinjiang railway through the Tian Shan range in Hejing County

Overview
- Status: Operational
- Locale: People's Republic of China: Xinjiang
- Termini: Turpan railway station; Kashgar railway station

Service
- Type: Heavy rail
- System: China Railway
- Operator(s): China Railway Ürümqi Group

History
- Opened: 1984 (Turpan–Korla); 1999 (Korla–Kashgar)

Technical
- Line length: 1,930 km (1,200 mi)
- Number of tracks: 2 (Turpan–Aksu; Double-track railway); 1 (Aksu–Kashgar; Single-track railway)
- Track gauge: 1,435 mm (4 ft 8 1/2 in) standard gauge
- Minimum radius: 800 m (2,625 ft)
- Electrification: 25 kV AC, 50 Hz (Turpan–Korla)
- Operating speed: 160km/h
- Highest elevation: 2.2%

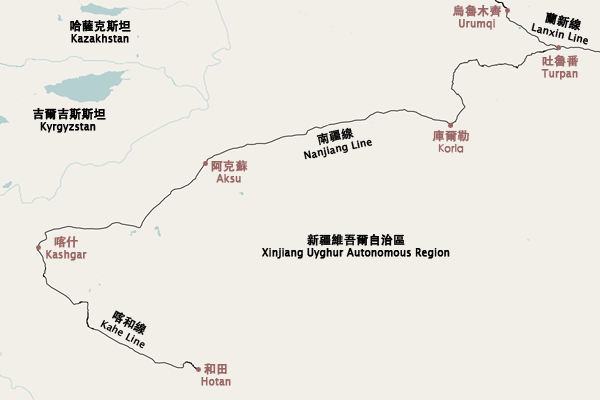
Map of the Southern Xinjiang (Nanjiang) railway from Turpan to Kashgar

The Southern Xinjiang railway or Nanjiang railway (simplified Chinese: 南疆铁路; traditional Chinese: 南疆鐵路; pinyin: Nánjiāng tiělù), is a railway between Turpan and Kashgar in Xinjiang, China. The railway is 1,446 km (899 mi) in length and runs along the southern slope of the Tian Shan mountain range, connecting all major cities and towns of the Northern Tarim Basin, including Turpan, Hejing, Yanqi, Korla, Luntai (Bügür), Kuqa, Toksu (Xinhe), Aksu, Maralbexi (Bachu), Artux, and Kashgar.

The line joins the Lanzhou–Xinjiang railway at Turpan (connecting to Ürümqi) and the Kashgar–Hotan railway in Kashgar. It also forms the Taklimakan Desert railway loop, together with sections of the Hotan–Ruoqiang railway, Kashgar–Hotan railway, and Golmud–Korla railway.

== History ==
The Southern Xinjiang railway was built from east to west. The Turpan-Korla section in the east (457 km) was built from 1974 to 1984. The western section from Korla to Kashgar (988 km (614 mi)) was built from 1996 to 1999. From Yanqi to Kashgar, the line follows National Highway 314. The Kashgar–Hotan railway, originally referred to as Phase III of the Southern Xinjiang railway, opened in 2010. From 2008 to 2013, the Korla to Aksu section, 526.9 km (327 mi) in length, was double-tracked.

In December 2014, a second double-track electrified line between Turpan and Korla opened to commercial operation. This new line, called the second Turpan–Korla railway, is 334 km (208 mi) in length. The line makes use of extensive tunneling to shorten the distance between the two cities by 123 km (76 mi). The maximum elevation along route is lowered from 2,980 m (9,777 ft) to 1,490 m (4,888 ft), and the steepest incline is reduced from 22.7‰ to 13‰. The longest tunnel along route, the Middle Tianshan Tunnel, is 22.467 km (14.0 mi) in length and one of the longest railway tunnels in China.

On 1 January 2021, a branch from south of Kalpin to Tumxuk was opened to passenger service. It is 31 kilometres (19 mi) long and has a design speed of 100 kilometres per hour (62 mph).

== Station list ==
| Station | Chinese | Distance (km) | Location | |
|---|---|---|---|---|
| Turpan^{Lanzhou–Xinjiang railway} | 吐鲁番 | 0 | Gaochang | Turpan |
| Longpan | 龙盘 | | Gaochang | Turpan |
| Tiequan | 铁泉 | | Gaochang | Turpan |
| Zhenzhuquan | 珍珠泉 | | Gaochang | Turpan |
| Hongshanqu | 红山渠 | | Gaochang | Turpan |
| Toksun | 托克逊 | | Toksun County | Turpan |
| Wangbu | 望布 | | Toksun County | Turpan |
| Burjiayi | 布尔加依 | | Toksun County | Turpan |
| Yurgou | 鱼儿沟 | | Dabancheng | Ürümqi |
| Zulumutai | 祖鲁木台 | | Toksun County | Turpan |
| Kargante | 喀尔干特 | | Toksun County | Turpan |
| Xiageze | 夏格泽 | | Toksun County | Turpan |
| Xingyuan | 星源 | | Toksun County | Turpan |
| Guoguang | 国光 | | Hejing County | Bayingolin Prefecture |
| Alagou | 阿拉沟 | | Hejing County | Bayingolin Prefecture |
| Kulin'aman | 库林阿曼 | | Hejing County | Bayingolin Prefecture |
| Dedaigou | 德代沟 | | Hejing County | Bayingolin Prefecture |
| Dewentuo | 德文托盖 | | Hejing County | Bayingolin Prefecture |
| Zhahesala | 扎和萨拉 | | Hejing County | Bayingolin Prefecture |
| Wusite | 乌斯特 | | Hejing County | Bayingolin Prefecture |
| Harge | 哈尔格 | | Hejing County | Bayingolin Prefecture |
| Shengliqiao | 胜利桥 | | Hejing County | Bayingolin Prefecture |
| Shangxinguang | 上新光 | | Hejing County | Bayingolin Prefecture |
| Xiaxinguang | 下新光 | | Hejing County | Bayingolin Prefecture |
| Haranggu | 哈让古 | | Hejing County | Bayingolin Prefecture |
| Baluntai | 巴伦台 | | Hejing County | Bayingolin Prefecture |
| Husitai | 胡斯台 | | Hejing County | Bayingolin Prefecture |
| Daxigou | 大西沟 | | Hejing County | Bayingolin Prefecture |
| Tianqiaonan | 天桥南 | | Hejing County | Bayingolin Prefecture |
| Mogatu | 莫嘎图 | | Hejing County | Bayingolin Prefecture |
| Hejing | 和静 | 369 | Hejing County | Bayingolin Prefecture |
| Bakeshu | 八棵树 | | Hejing County | Bayingolin Prefecture |
| Xingfutan | 幸福滩 | | Hejing County | Bayingolin Prefecture |
| Yanqi | 焉耆 | 400 | Yanqi County | Bayingolin Prefecture |
| Baorhai | 包尔海 | | Yanqi County | Bayingolin Prefecture |
| Ziniquan | 紫泥泉 | | Yanqi County | Bayingolin Prefecture |
| Tashidian | 塔什店 | | Korla | Bayingolin Prefecture |
| Yunya | 云崖 | | Korla | Bayingolin Prefecture |
| Korla | 库尔勒 | 457 | Korla | Bayingolin Prefecture |
| Kubei | 库北 | | Korla | Bayingolin Prefecture |
| Kuxi | 库西 | | Korla | Bayingolin Prefecture |
| Xiaota | 肖塔 | | Korla | Bayingolin Prefecture |
| Kuluke | 库鲁克 | | Luntai County | Bayingolin Prefecture |
| Yeyungou | 野云沟 | | Luntai County | Bayingolin Prefecture |
| Cedaya | 策达雅 | | Luntai County | Bayingolin Prefecture |
| Yangxia | 阳霞 | | Luntai County | Bayingolin Prefecture |
| Talake | 塔拉克 | | Luntai County | Bayingolin Prefecture |
| Luntai | 轮台 | | Luntai County | Bayingolin Prefecture |
| Erbatai | 二八台 | | Kuqa County | Aksu Prefecture |
| Yakela | 雅克拉 | | Kuqa County | Aksu Prefecture |
| Yaha | 牙哈 | | Kuqa County | Aksu Prefecture |
| Kuqa | 库车 | 740 | Kuqa County | Aksu Prefecture |
| Kuqa West^{Kuqa–Ehuobulake Railway} | 库车西 | | Kuqa County | Aksu Prefecture |
| Xinhe | 新和 | 779 | Xinhe County | Aksu Prefecture |
| Yisekesu | 伊斯克苏 | | Xinhe County | Aksu Prefecture |
| Terxike | 特尔希克 | | Xinhe County | Aksu Prefecture |
| Yangtake Kuduke | 羊塔克库都克 | | Xinhe County | Aksu Prefecture |
| Xianshuigou | 咸水沟 | | Wensu County | Aksu Prefecture |
| Kalayurgun | 喀拉玉尔滚 | | Wensu County | Aksu Prefecture |
| Paman | 帕满 | | Wensu County | Aksu Prefecture |
| Aksu | 阿克苏 | 983 | Aksu | Aksu Prefecture |
| Sanjiaodi | 三角地 | | Aksu | Aksu Prefecture |
| Jinyinchuan | 金银川 | | Aksu | Aksu Prefecture |
| Kalpin | 柯坪 | | Kalpin County | Aksu Prefecture |
| Yijianfeng | 一间房 | | Bachu County | Kashi Prefecture |
| Bachu | 巴楚 | 1,200 | Bachu County | Kashi Prefecture |
| Wudaoban | 五道班 | | Bachu County | Kashi Prefecture |
| Xiger | 西格尔 | | Artux | Kizilsu Prefecture |
| Bapanmo | 八盘磨 | | Artux | Kizilsu Prefecture |
| Artux | 阿图什 | 1,410 | Artux | Kizilsu Prefecture |
| Kashi^{Kashgar–Hotan railway} | 喀什 | 1,445 | Kashi | Kashi Prefecture |

== Rail connections ==
- Turpan: Lanzhou–Xinjiang railway
- Kashgar: Kashgar–Hotan railway

== Gallery ==
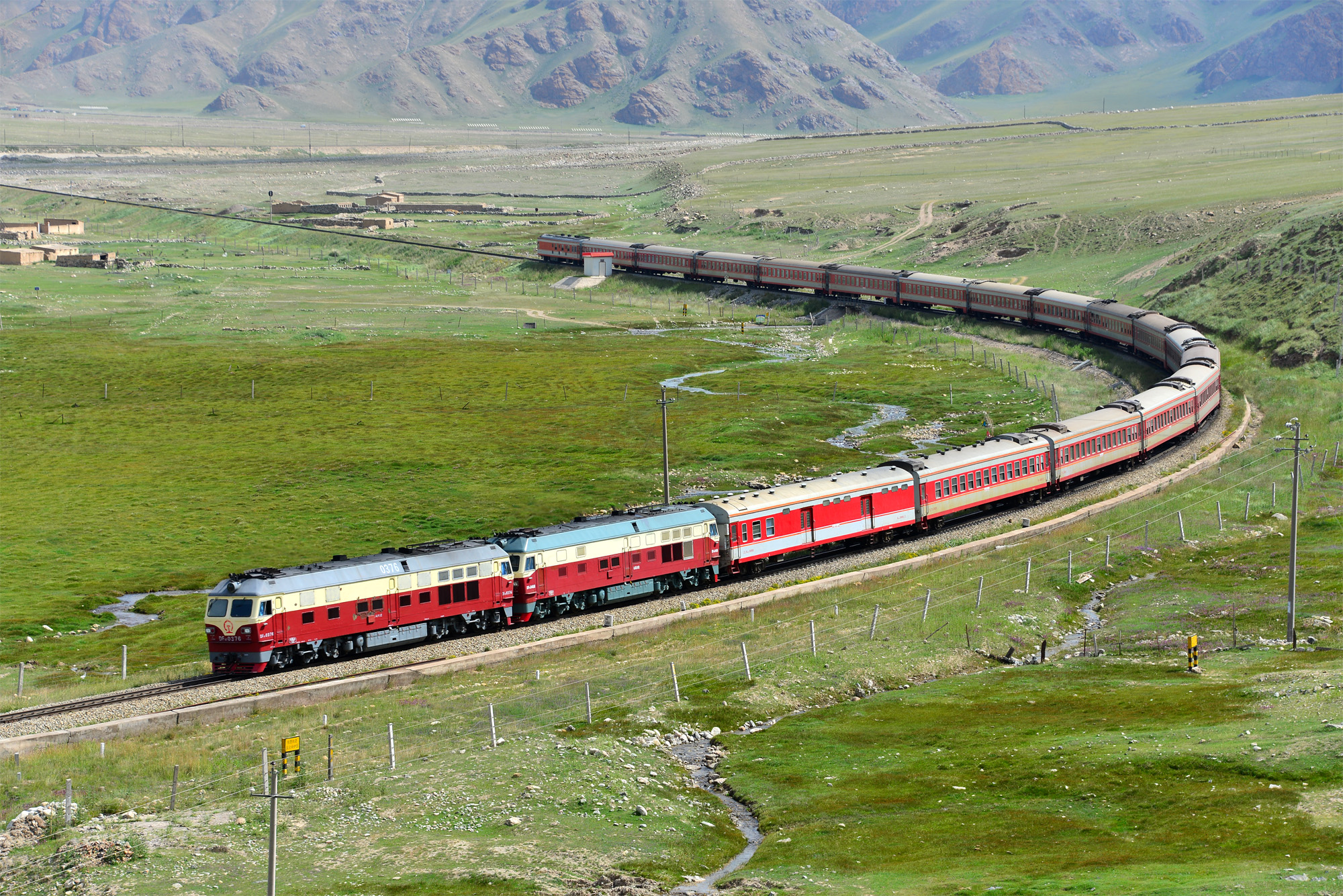
Train No.K169 running on the railway

Through the Tian Shan in Hejing County

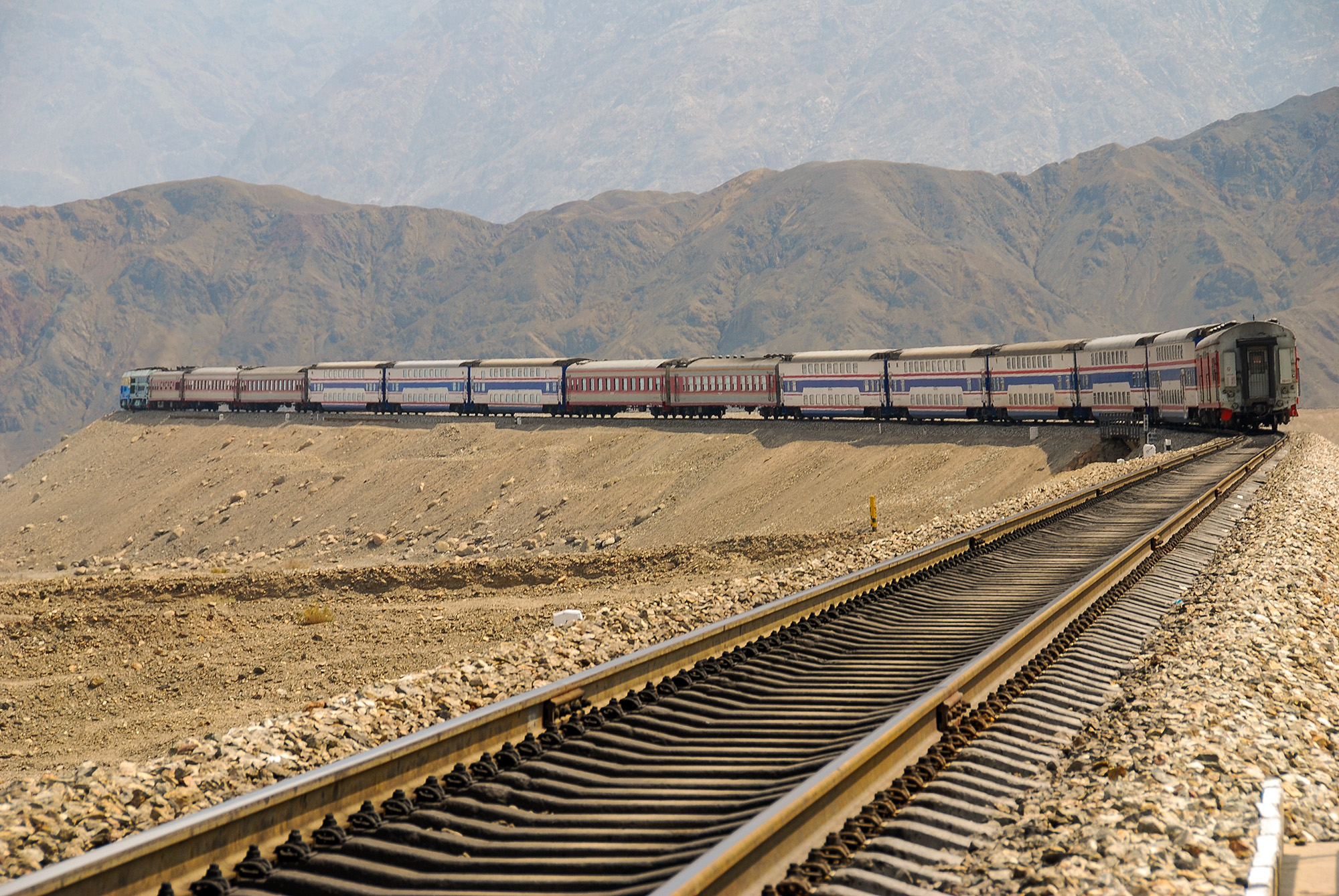
Train running between mountains in Toksun County, Turpan

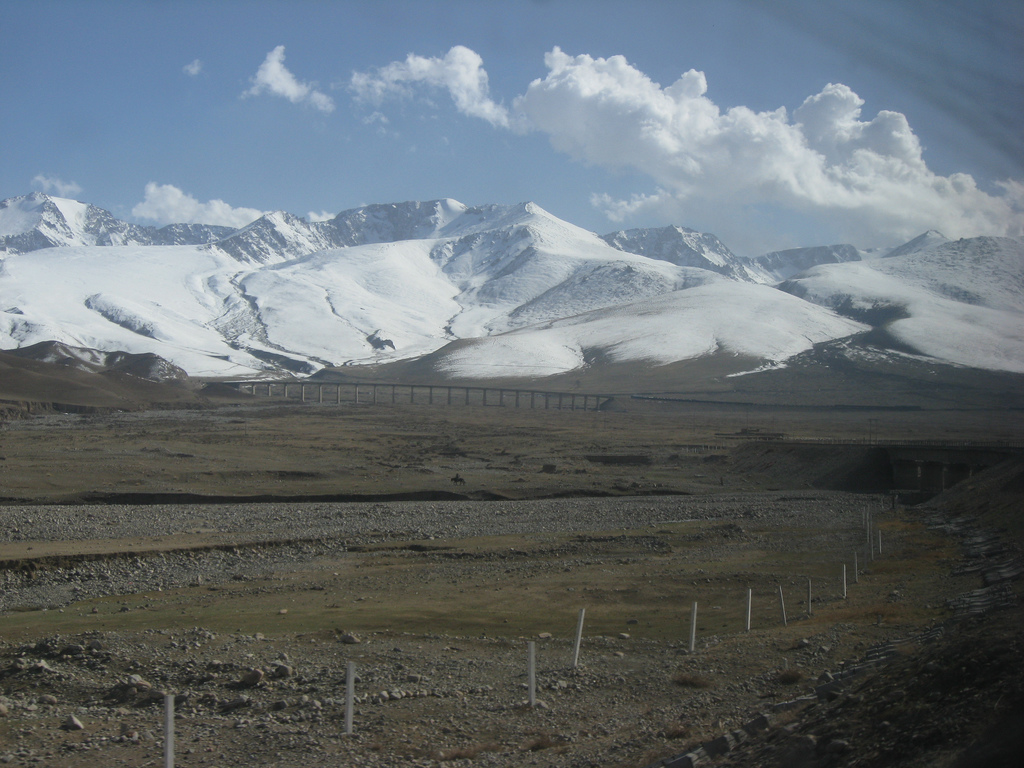
Hejing County section in winter

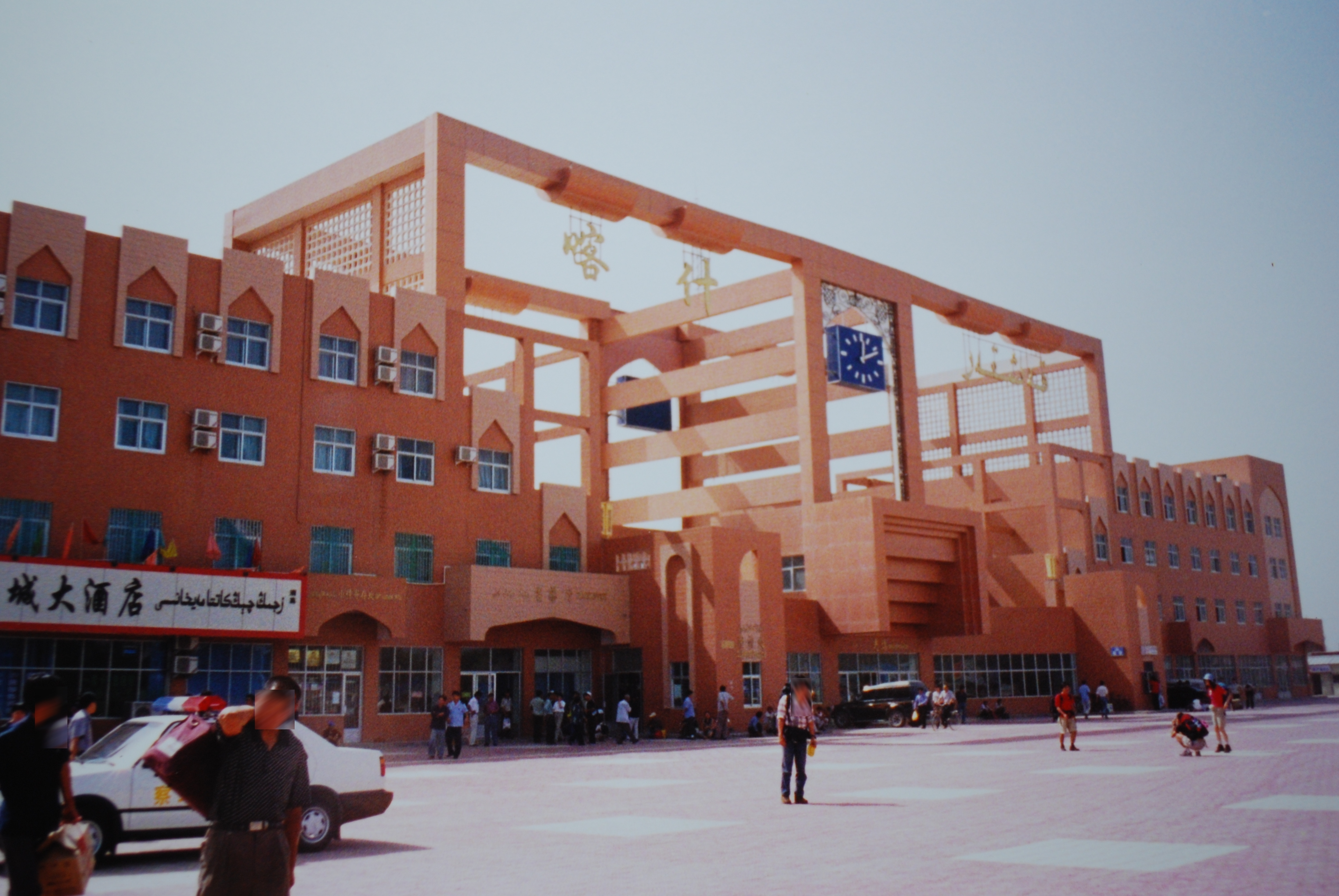
Kashgar Station

== See also ==
- List of railways in China
