= Pilal =

Pilal 皮拉勒乡 (Chinese) پىلال يېزىسى (Uyghur) پىلال ايىلى (Kyrgyz) Pilale
- Township
- Location of the township
- Coordinates: 39.18982671°N 75.8546808469°E
- Country: People's Republic of China
- Autonomous region: Xinjiang
- Prefecture: Kizilsu
- County: Akto

Area
  - Total: 186 km^{2} (72 sq mi)

Population (2015)
  - Total: 46,981

Ethnic groups
  - Major ethnic groups: Uyghur
- Time zone: UTC+8 (China Standard Time)
- postal code: 845551
- Area code: 653022 201
- Website: www.xjakt.gov.cn

Pilal (Uyghur: پىلال يېزىسى; from Mandarin Chinese Pilale Chinese: 皮拉勒乡; pinyin: Pílālè Xiāng or 皮拉力乡) is a township of Akto County in Xinjiang Uygur Autonomous Region, China. Located in the west of the northeastern part of the county, the township covers an area of 186 square kilometers with a population of 46,981 (as of 2015). It has 22 administrative villages and a farm under its jurisdiction. Its seat is at Pilal Village (皮拉勒村).

== Name ==
The name of Piral is from Uighur language, that evolved from the word "pul-al", meaning "paying" or "pay money" (拿钱来). The place was named Pilal because there used to be a market in this place 270 years ago (about 1750s).

== History ==
In 1958, Pilal Commune was established (皮拉勒公社).

In 1967 during the Cultural Revolution, Pilal Commune was renamed Hongqi Commune (literally 'Red Flag Commune'; 红旗公社).

In 1984, the commune became Pilal Township.

In September 2017, it was reported that a policewoman from Pilal had claimed that "several thousand detainees" were in the Xinjiang re-education camps system in Akto County, saying the facilities were "closed schools" where authorities keep internees "detained day and night, and they continuously receive political and ideological education." She further commented that, "A few people are released after two or three months. But most detainees are sent to the camps indefinitely."

== Geography and resources ==
The township of Pilal is located between 75°45′- 76°01′ east longitude and 38°08′- 39°16′ north latitude and in the alluvial plain of Gez River to the northwest of the county seat. It is bordered by Tortayi Farm to the east, by Barin Township, Akto Town and Ujme Township to the south, by Buraksu Township of Shufu County to the west, by the 41st Regiment (41团) of the XPCC across Yuepuhu River (岳普湖河) to the north. Its maximum distance is 24 kilometers from west to east and 11 kilometers from north to south. It has an area of 186 square kilometers with an area of 6 118 hectares of arable land. The distance between the seat of the township and the county seat is 11 kilometers.

The township has a temperate continental arid climate with a long frost-free period. Its annual average temperature is 12 °C, the average temperature in January is -7.4 °C, and the average temperature in July is 24.9 °C. Its terrain is flat with sufficient water source. It is rich in mineral resources, mainly iron, copper, gold, aluminum, zinc and coal.

The soil is fertile, part of which are silt and salt soil. The natural conditions for developing agriculture are very advantageous. Pilal Township has a long history of planting rice. It is known as the “Plateau Rice land” (高原稻乡) and is the main rice producing area in Akto County.

== Administrative divisions ==
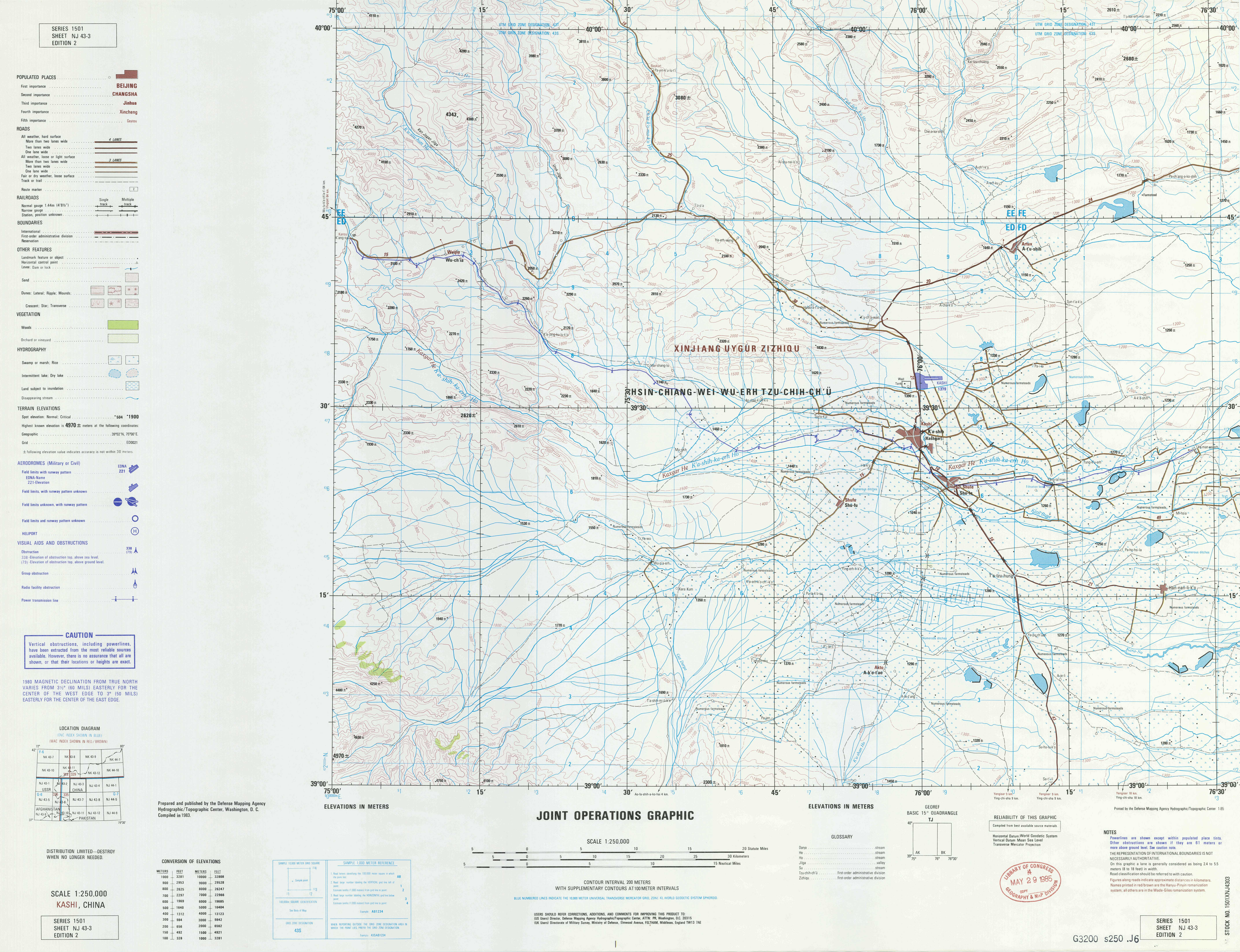
Map of the Kashgar area including Pilal (labeled as P'i-la-li) (DMA, 1983)

The township has 22 administration villages and a farm under its jurisdiction.

22 administration villages

- Aqmechit (Unity) Village (Akemeiqitecun (Tuanjiecun)) (阿克美其特村 (团结村), ئاقمەسچىت كەنتى (ئىتتىپاق), اقمەچئت قىشتاعى (ىنتىماق))
- Aqtichi Village (Aktiqicun) (阿克提其村, ئاقتىچى كەنتى, اقتووچۇ قىشتاعى)
  - 39°09′51″N 075°52′42″E
- Aqto Village (Aketucun) (阿克土村, ئاقتو كەنتى, ﺍﻗﺘﻮﻭ قىشتاعى)
  - 39°10′03″N 075°56′07″E
- Beshterek Village (Baishitierekecun) (拜什铁热克村, بەشتېرەك كەنتى, بەشتەرەك قىشتاعى)
- Charbagh Village (Qia'erbagecun) (恰尔巴格村, چارباغ كەنتى, چارباق قىشتاعى)
- Chongbash Village (Qiongbashi; 琼巴什村, چوڭباش كەنتى, چوڭباش قىشتاعى)
- Dondura Village (Dundourecun) (墩都热村, دوندۇرا كەنتى, دوندۇرو قىشتاعى)
- Hoyla'aldi Village (Huoyila'aledicun) (霍依拉阿勒迪村, ھويلا ئالدى كەنتى, حويلو الدى قىشتاعى)
- Inaq Village (Yinakecun) (依纳克村, ئىناق كەنتى, ىناق قىشتاعى)
- Kosila Village (Kuosalacun) (阔苏拉村, كوسىلا كەنتى, كۅسئلا قىشتاعى)
- Parach Village (Palaqicun) (帕拉其村, پاراچ كەنتى, پاراچ قىشتاعى)
- Pilal Village (Pilalecun) (皮拉勒村, پىلال كەنتى, پىلال قىشتاعى)
- Qarasu Village (Kalasucun) (喀拉苏村, قاراسۇ كەنتى, قاراسۇۇ قىشتاعى)
- Suluq Village (Sulukecun) (苏鲁克村, سۇلۇق كەنتى, سۇۇلۇق قىشتاعى)
  - 39°13′14″N 075°53′04″E
- Tazliq Village (Tazilekecun) (塔孜勒克村, تازلىق كەنتى, تازلىق قىشتاعى)
- Toghraq Village (Tuogelakecun) (托格拉克村, توغراق كەنتى, تۇۇرۇق قىشتاعى)
- Tughchi Village (Tuogeqicun) (托格其村, تۇغچى كەنتى, تۅۅچۉ قىشتاعى)
- Uzunla Village (Wuzunlacun) (乌尊拉村, ئۇزۇنلا كەنتى, ۇزۇنلا قىشتاعى)
- Yaylighan Village (Yiyeleigancun) (依也勒干村, يېيىلغان كەنتى, جايىلعان قىشتاعى)
- Yengi'arpa Village (Ying'a'erpacun) (英阿尔帕村, يېڭى ئارپا كەنتى, جاڭى ارپا قىشتاعى)
- Yengibagh Village (Yingbagecun) (英巴格村, يېڭىباغ كەنتى, جاڭى باق قىشتاعى)
- Yikchile Village (Yikeqilaicun) (依克其来村, يىكچىلە كەنتى, ەكئچئلە قىشتاعى)

a farm

- Qingnian Farm (青年农场 / 青年农场生活区, ياشلار دېھقانچىلىق مەيدانى, جاشتار دىيقانچىلىق مايدانى)

Unincorporated villages

- Qarliq (喀尔勒克, قارلىق, قارلىق)

== Demographics ==
Historical population
Year	Pop.	±% p.a.
2000	34,498	—
2010	43,228	+2.28%

As of 1997, 93.1% of the residents of Pilal were Uyghur.

== Economy ==
Water resources are plentiful. Japonica rice is produced in abundance and Pilal is the main rice producing area of Akto County.

== See also ==
- List of township-level divisions of Xinjiang
