= Turtay Farm =

Turtay Farm 托尔塔依农场 تۇرتاي دېھقانچىلىق مەيدانى تۇرتاي دىيقانچىلىق مايدانى Tuo'ertayi Farm
- State-owned farm
- Location of the farm
- Coordinates: 39.2145688812°N 76.0092483497°E
- Country: China
- Autonomous region: Xinjiang
- Prefecture: Kizilsu
- County: Akto

Area
  - Total: 43 km^{2} (17 sq mi)

Population (2015)
  - Total: 4,768
- Time zone: UTC+8 (China Standard Time)
- postal code: 845553
- Area code: 653022 400
- Website: www.xjakt.gov.cn

Turtay Farm (Chinese: 托尔塔依农场; pinyin: Tuō'ěrtǎyī Nóngchǎng; Uyghur: تۇرتاي دېھقانچىلىق مەيدانى, turtay dëhqanchiliq meydani) is a local state-owned farm of Akto County in Xinjiang Uygur Autonomous Region, China. The farm is located in the northeast of Akto County and 8 kilometers away northeast of Akto Town. It covers an area of 43 square kilometers with 1,238 households and a population of 4,768 (as of 2015). The farm is divided into 8 production teams and quartered in Turtay Village of Jamaterek Township.

The name of Turtay (تۇرتاي) is from Uighur language, meaning "date red foal" (枣红色的马驹). The farm was formed in 1958 as the 2nd branch of Hongqi Farm of Kizilsu Kyrgyz Autonomous Prefecture (克州红旗农场二分场) and transferred to Akto County under its administration in 1973, it was renamed to the present name in 1981.

== See also ==
- List of township-level divisions of Xinjiang
