= Karakeqik =

Karakeqik 喀热克其克乡 (Chinese) قاراكېچىك يېزىسى (Uyghur) قاراكەچۉۉ ايىلى (Kyrgyz) Karekeqike, Karekaiqike
- Township
- Location of the township
- Coordinates: 39.2805901601°N 75.6825928885°E
- Country: People's Republic of China
- Autonomous region: Xinjiang
- Prefecture: Kizilsu
- County: Akto

Area
  - Total: 108 km^{2} (42 sq mi)
- Elevation: 1,300 m (4,300 ft)

Population (2015)
  - Total: 5,728

Ethnic groups
  - Major ethnic groups: Uyghur
- Time zone: UTC+8 (China Standard Time)
- postal code: 844100
- Area code: 653022 203
- Website: www.xjakt.gov.cn

Karakeqik (Uyghur: قاراكېچىك يېزىسى, Chinese: 喀热克其克乡, 喀热开其克乡; pinyin: Kārèkèqíkè Xiāng, Kārèkāiqíkè Xiāng) is a township of Akto County in Xinjiang Uygur Autonomous Region, China. Located in the northeast of the county, the township covers an area of 108 square kilometers with a population of 5,728 (as of 2015). It has 4 administrative villages under its jurisdiction. Its seat is at Bostan Village (博斯坦村).

== Name ==
The name of Karakeqik is from Uighur language, meaning "spring water rivulet" (泉水沟). There was once a rivulet formed by spring water in the east of the land, so it was named after that.

== Geography and resources ==
Karakeqik Township is located between 75°07′- 75°38′ east longitude and 39°00′- 39°18′ north latitude, in the alluvial fans of the Gez River (盖孜河) in the northwest of Akto County. It is bordered by Blaksu (布拉克苏乡), Saybag (萨依巴格乡) and Wupar (乌帕尔乡) townships of Shufu County to the east, south and north, by Bostanterak Township of Wuqia County and Oytak Town to the west. It has a total area of 108 square meters with arable land area of 1,694 hectares (including shelter forest). The township is 43 kilometers away from the county seat and 37 kilometers away from Kashi City. As of 2015, there were 1,431 households with 5,728 people in the township.

The average elevation of Karakeqik is 1,300 meters. The terrain is high in the southwest and low in the northeast. It is surrounded by water on three sides and has a typical temperate continental arid climate. The annual rainfall is 80–120 mm, and the frost-free period is 220 days. There are two river systems, Gez River and Wupal River (乌帕尔河). The water source is sufficient, suitable for planting crops such as wheat, corn and rice.

== Administrative divisions ==
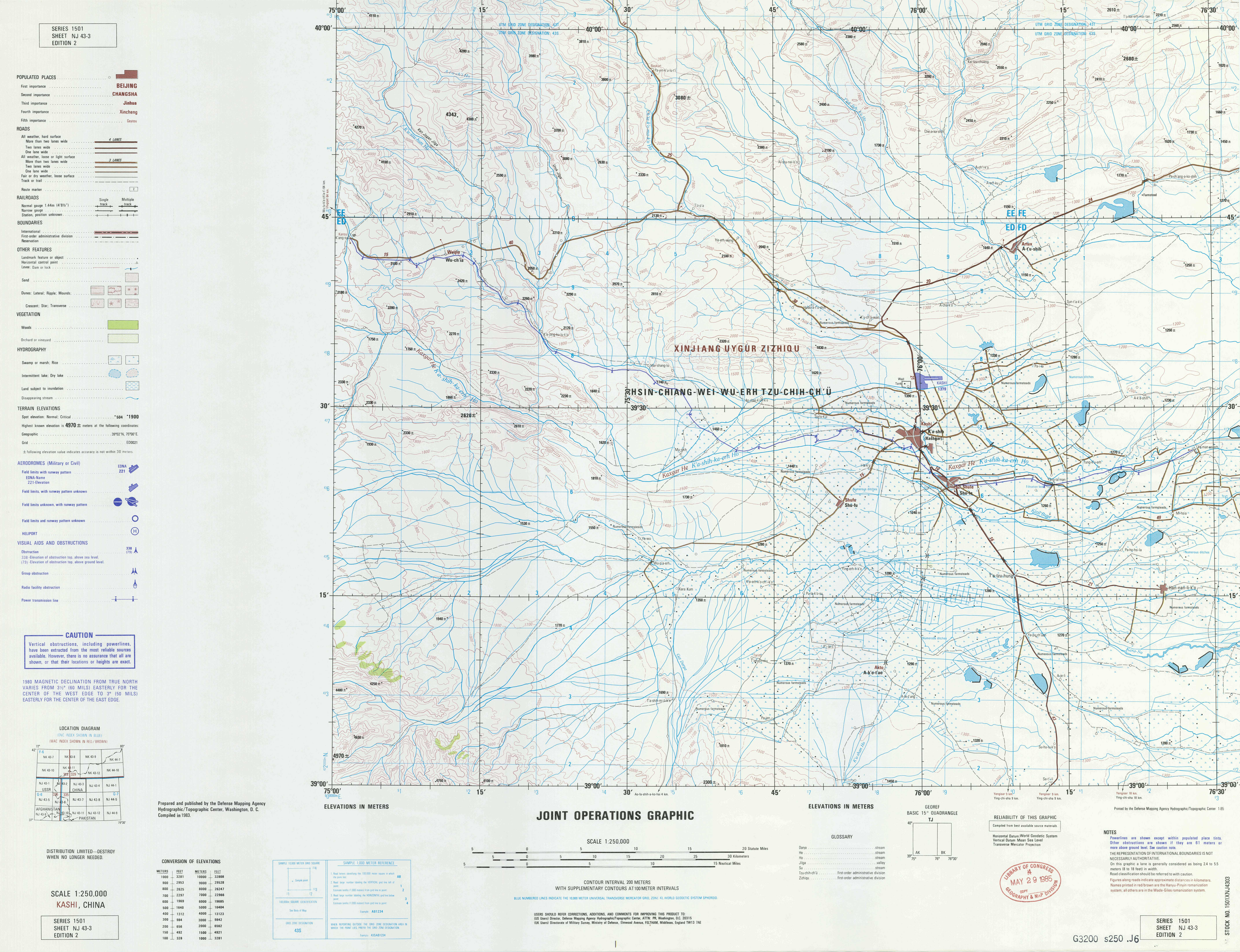
Map of the Kashgar area including the area where the township is located (DMA, 1983)

The township has 4 administration villages and 29 unincorporated villages under its jurisdiction.

4 administration villages

- Binam Village (Binamucun) (比纳木村, بىنام كەنتى, مىينام قىشتاعى)
  - 39°17′48″N 075°41′29″E
- Bostan Village (Bositancun (博斯坦村, بوستان كەنتى, بوستان قىشتاعى)
- Qoshdowe Village (Kuoshendouweicun) (阔什都维村, قوش دۆۋە كەنتى, قوش دۅۅ قىشتاعى)
  - 39°16′34″N 075°39′00″E
- Topraqliq Village (Tuopurelikecun) (托普热利克村, تۇپراقلىق كەنتى, توپۇراقتىق قىشتاعى)

Unincorporated villages

- Dongmahalla (墩买里, دۆڭمەھەللە, دۅڭماحاللا)
- Mazartograk (麻扎托格拉克, مازارتوغراق, مازارتۇۇراق)

== Demographics ==
Historical population
Year	Pop.	±% p.a.
2000	4,259	—
2010	5,299	+2.21%
2015	5,728	+1.57%

As of 1997, the population of the township was 75.9% Uyghur.

== See also ==
- List of township-level divisions of Xinjiang
