= Astragalus xijiangensis =

Scientific classification
- Kingdom: Plantae
- Clade: Embryophytes
- Clade: Tracheophytes
- Clade: Angiosperms
- Clade: Eudicots
- Clade: Rosids
- Order: Fabales
- Family: Fabaceae
- Subfamily: Faboideae
- Genus: Astragalus
- Species: A. xijiangensis

Binomial name
- Astragalus xijiangensis L.R.Xu & Y.H.Wu

Species of flowering plant

Astragalus xijiangensis is a species of flowering plant in the family Fabaceae.

A. xijiangensis is native to Xinjiang, China.

== Taxonomy ==
The holotype was collected in July 1987, in Akto County, at an elevation of 4,300 metres (14,100 ft). The species was first described in August 2015, by Lang Ran Xu and Yu Hu Wu.
