= Tar Tajik Township =

Ethnic township in southern Xinjiang, China

Tar Tajik Township: 塔尔塔吉克民族乡 (Chinese); تار تاجىك مىللىي يېزىسى (Uyghur); تار تاجئك ۇلۇتتۇق ايىلى (Kyrgyz); تار تۇجىك مىلى دىيۇر (Sarikoli)
- Township
- Location of the township in southern Xinjiang
- Coordinates: 37.8463413977°N 76.0611296948°E
- Country: People's Republic of China
- Autonomous region: Xinjiang
- Prefecture: Kizilsu
- County: Akto

Area
  - Total: 1,009.7 km^{2} (389.8 sq mi)

Population (2015)
  - Total: 5,408
- Time zone: UTC+8 (China Standard Time)
- postal code: 845550
- Area code: 653022 210
- Website: www.xjakt.gov.cn

Tar Tajik Township (Chinese: 塔尔塔吉克族乡; Uyghur: تار تاجىك يېزىسى) is an ethnic township for Chinese Tajiks in Akto County, in Xinjiang, China. Located in the southernmost part of the county, the township covers an area of 1,009.7 square kilometers with a population of 5,408 (as of 2015). It has 8 administrative villages under its jurisdiction. Its seat is Bag Village (巴格村).

== Name ==
The name "Tar" is from the Sarikoli language and means "narrow". The township was so-named because it is located in a narrow river valley in the mountains.

== Geography and resources ==
Tar is the southernmost township of Akto County, located in the western Kunlun Mountains. It is bordered by Qarlung Township to the north and east, and Taxkorgan County to the south and west. It has an area of 1,009.7 square kilometers with 422.59 hectares of arable land. Its seat, Bag Village, is 420 kilometers away from the county seat, Akto Town. As of 2015, the township has 1,410 households and a population of 5,408.

== Administrative divisions ==
The township has 8 administration villages and 12 unincorporated villages under its jurisdiction.

8 administration villages:

- Almaliq Village (Alemalekecnu) (阿勒玛勒克村, ئالمىلىق كەنتى, المالىق قىشتاعى)
- Aqqum Village (Akekumucun) (阿克库木村, ئاققۇم كەنتى, اققۇم قىشتاعى)
- Bagh Village (Bagecun) (巴格村, باغ كەنتى, باق قىشتاعى)
- Bagh'aghzi Village (Bage'aigezicun) (巴格艾格孜村, باغئاغزى كەنتى, باق ووزۇ قىشتاعى)
- Beldir Village (Bieledi'ercun) (别勒迪尔村, بەلدىر كەنتى, بەلدئر قىشتاعى)
- Hosh'abat Village (Huoxi'abaticun) (霍西阿巴提村, خۇشئابات كەنتى, قوشابات قىشتاعى)
- Quzu Village (Kuzucun) (库祖村, قۇزۇ كەنتى, قوزۇ قىشتاعى)
- Tar'abat Village (Ta'er'abaticun) (塔尔阿巴提村, تارئابات كەنتى, تارابات قىشتاعى)

Unincorporated villages

- Kengsaz (康萨孜)

== Demographics ==
Historical population
Year	Pop.	±% p.a.
2000	3,159	—
2010	5,059	+4.82%

== See also ==
- List of township-level divisions of Xinjiang
