= Yumai =

Yumai (玉麦乡) may refer to the following townships:

- Ujme, also Yumai, Akto County, Kizilsu Kyrgyz Autonomous Prefecture, Xinjiang, China
- Yümai, Lhünzê County, Shannan Prefecture, Tibet, China
