= Oytak =

Oytak 奥依塔克镇 (Chinese) ئويتاغ بازىرى (Uyghur) ويتوو شاارچاسى (Kyrgyz) Aoyitake Auyitagh; Oytag
- Town
- Location of the town
- Coordinates: 39.0041104129°N 75.5566592011°E
- Country: People's Republic of China
- Autonomous region: Xinjiang
- Autonomous prefecture: Kizilsu
- County: Akto

Area
  - Total: 1,537 km^{2} (593 sq mi)

Population (2017)
  - Total: 5,093
- Time zone: UTC+8 (China Standard Time)
- Postal code: 845561
- Area code: 653022 101
- Website: www.xjakt.gov.cn/

Oytak Town (Chinese: 奥依塔克镇; pinyin: Àoyītǎkè Zhèn) is a town of Akto County in Xinjiang Uygur Autonomous Region, China. Located in the middle of the northeast of the county, the town covers an area of 1,537 square kilometers with a population of 5,093 (as of 2017). It has 4 villages with 16 villagers' groups under its jurisdiction, its seat is at Tokkuzotak (托库孜乌塔克).

== Name ==
The name of Oytak is from Kyrgyz language, meaning "sunken ravine" (凹山沟), or "a lowland in mountains" (山涧洼地) from the old Turkic language. It is named after the geologically famous Oytak Valley (奥依塔克沟) in the land. The name of the town is also spelled Oytag.

== Geography ==
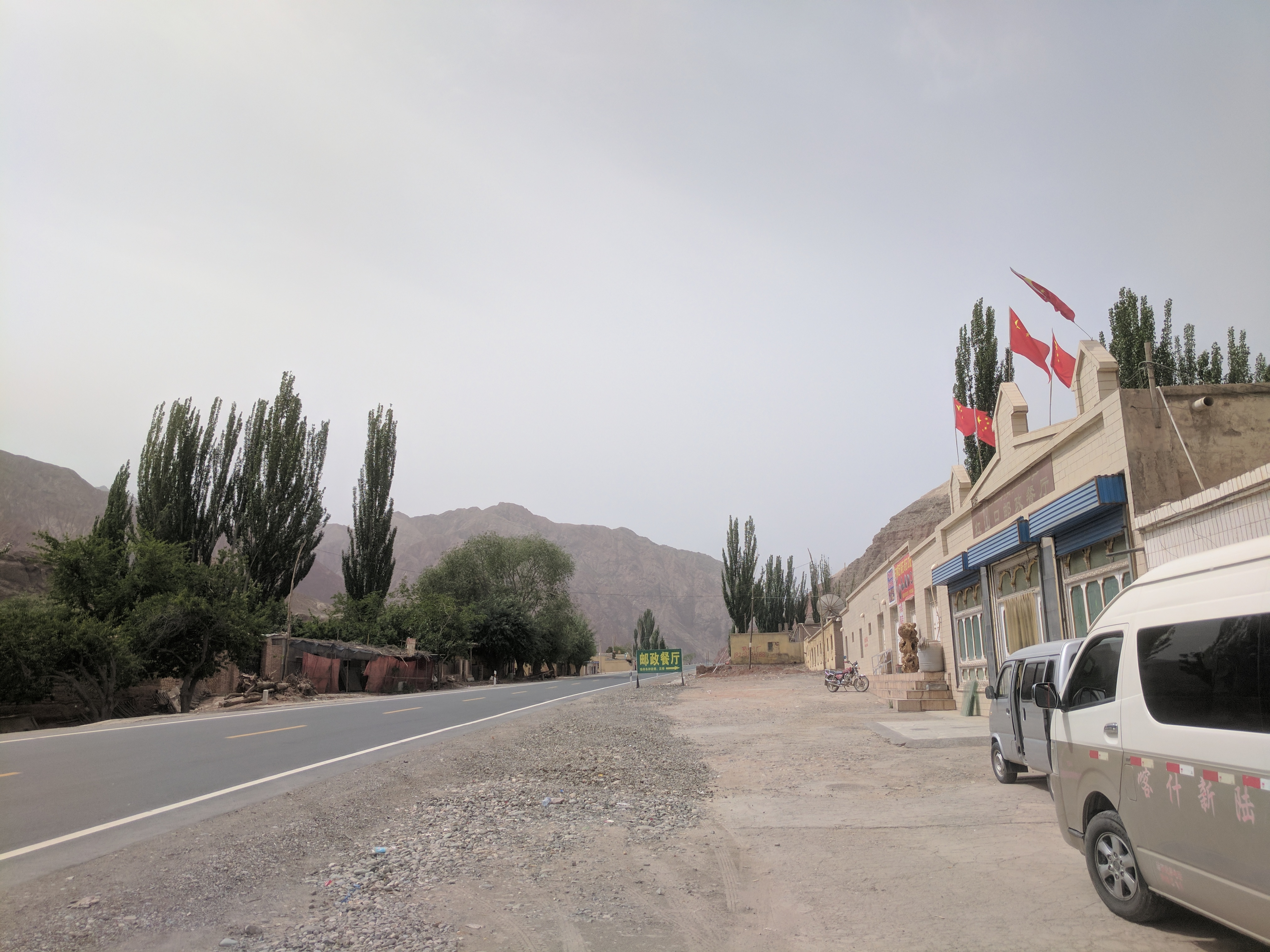
commercial outlets in Oytak, close to Karakoram Highway in Akto County

The town of Oytak is located between 75°58′～76°03′ east longitude and 39°12′- 39°16′ north latitude, 50 kilometers southwest of the county seat Akto Town. The Karakoram Highway runs through the town north to south, with convenient transportation. The area has a maximum length of 58 kilometers from west to east, a maximum length of 52 kilometers from north to south, and a total area of 1,537 square kilometers. Oytak is a semi-agricultural and semi-pastoral town with an area of 842.58 hectares of arable land, 49.21 hectares of orchard and 48.92 hectares of forest land. Oytak is a temperate continental dry climate with cool weather. The annual average temperature is 7.8 °C, the average temperature in January is −8.1 °C, the average temperature in July is 20.8 °C, and the frost-free period is 130–200 days.

== Resources ==
The main water system is the Gez River (盖孜河), the water resources are richer in the town. The town's economy is dominated by animal husbandry, and farming and animal husbandry are run. The land on both sides of the Gez River Valley is more fertile and flat. The main crops are wheat and corn. There are precious animals such as snow chicken and mongolian gazelle in the territory, and there are mineral resources such as iron, copper, gold, coal, oil shale, limestone, gypsum, clay and zeolite. The tourism resources are well-known Oytagh Glacier Park (奥依塔克森林公园), with glaciers, scenery and cool climate.

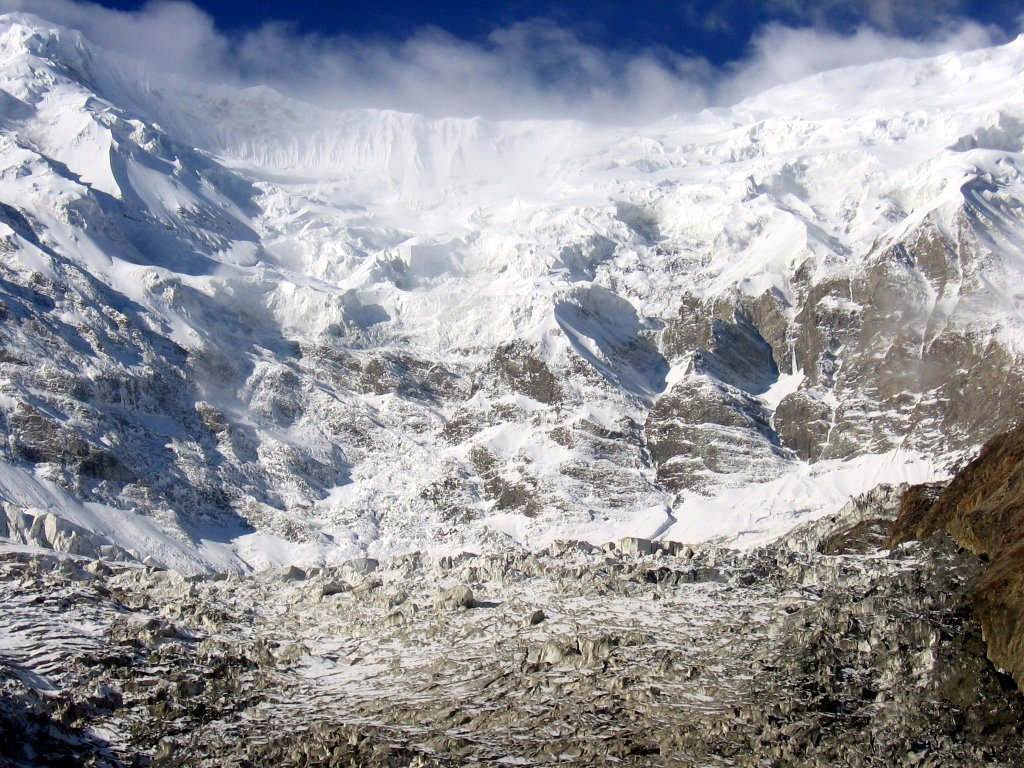
Snow mountains and glaciers, close to Karakoram Highway

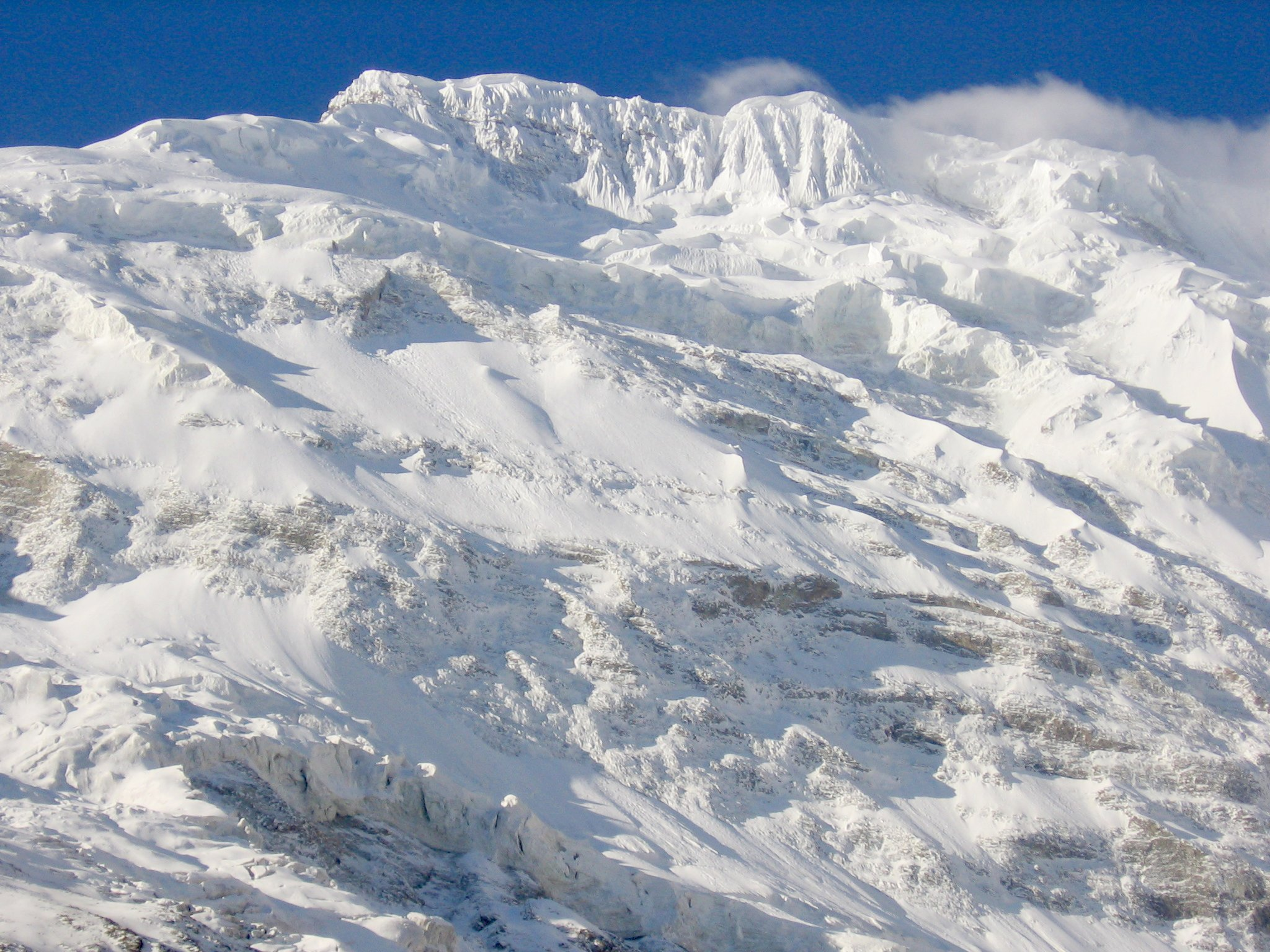
glaciers

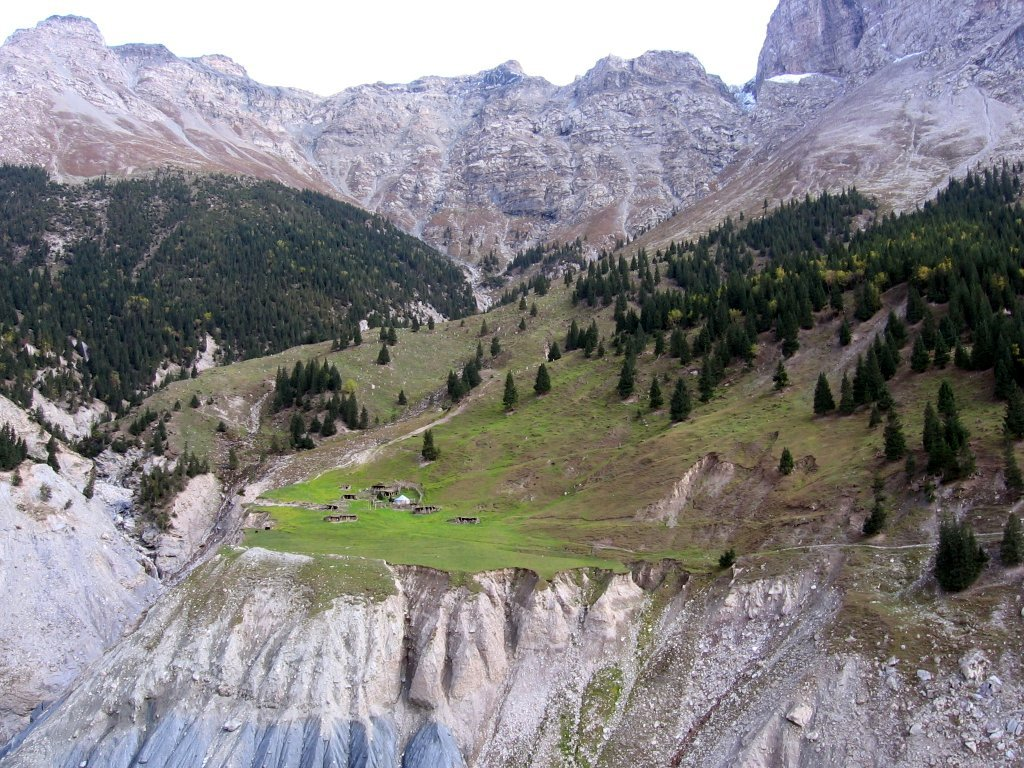
mountains

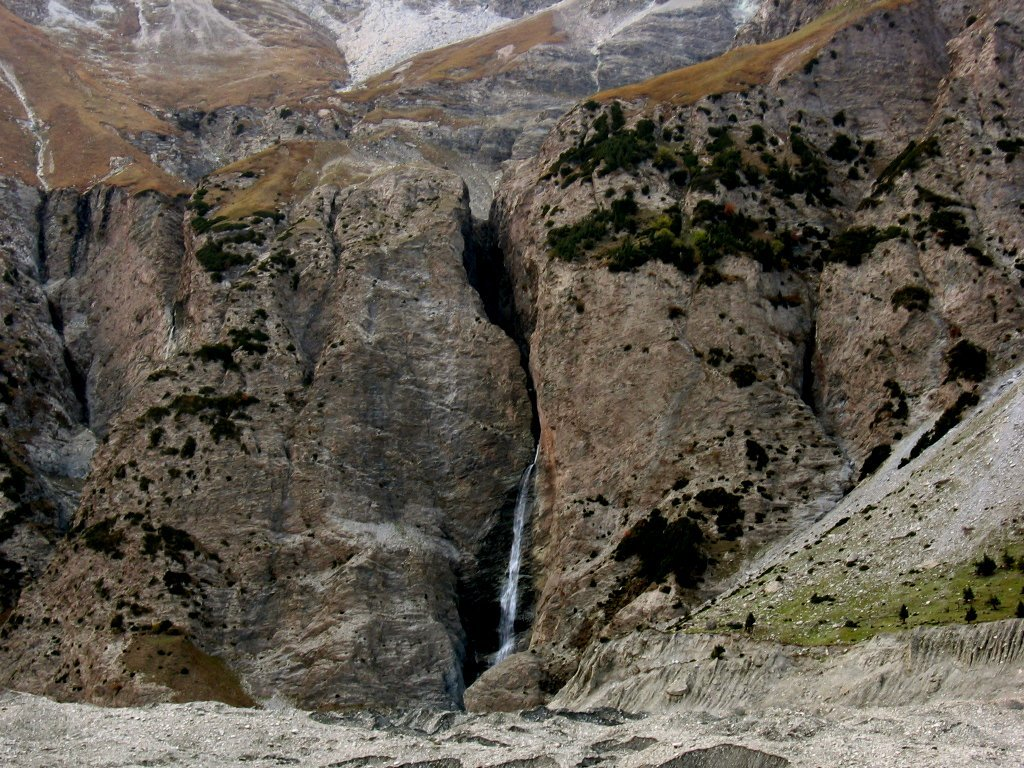
mountains

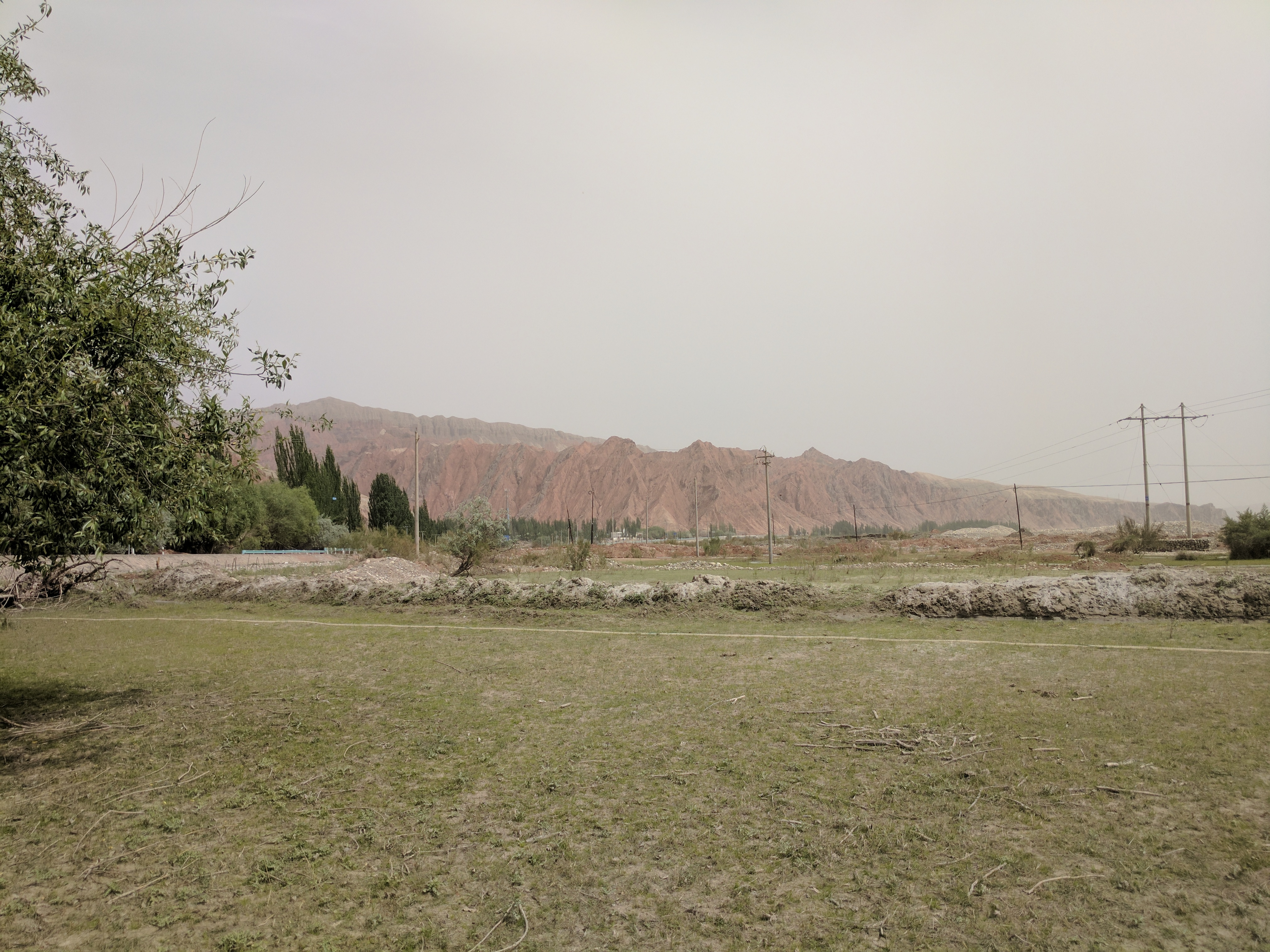
grassland in Oytak

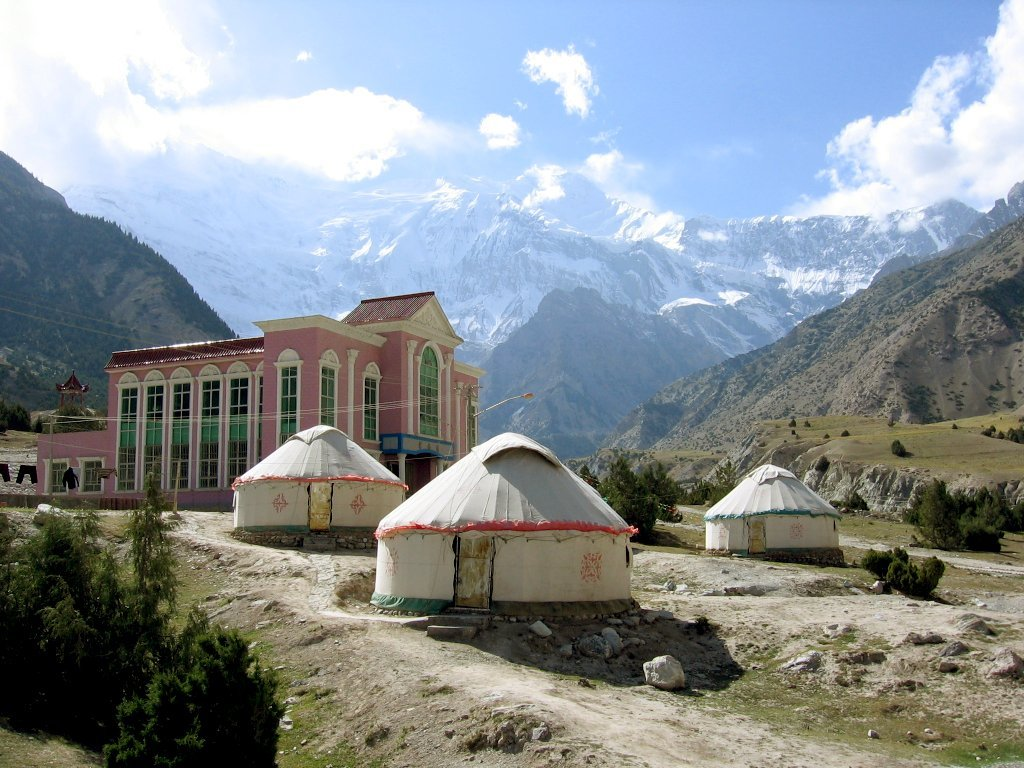
a hotel, close to Karakoram Highway

== Administrative divisions ==
The town has 4 villages under its jurisdiction.

4 administration villages

- At'oynaq village (阿特奥依纳克村, ئاتئويناق كەنتى, اتويناق قىشتاعى)
- Oytagh village (奥依塔克村, ئويتاغ كەنتى, ويتوو قىشتاعى)
- Pilal village (皮拉勒村, پىلال كەنتى, پىلال قىشتاعى)
- Chalma'eriq village (恰勒玛艾日克村, چالما ئېرىق كەنتى, چالما ارىق قىشتاعى)

Unincorporated villages

- Toqquztagh (托库孜乌塔克, توققۇزتاغ, توعۇزتوو)
- Oytagh Egiz (奥依塔克艾格孜, ئويتاغ ئېگىز, ويتوو ەگئز)

== See also ==
- List of township-level divisions of Xinjiang
