= 2016 Akto earthquake =

Earthquake in Xinjiang, China

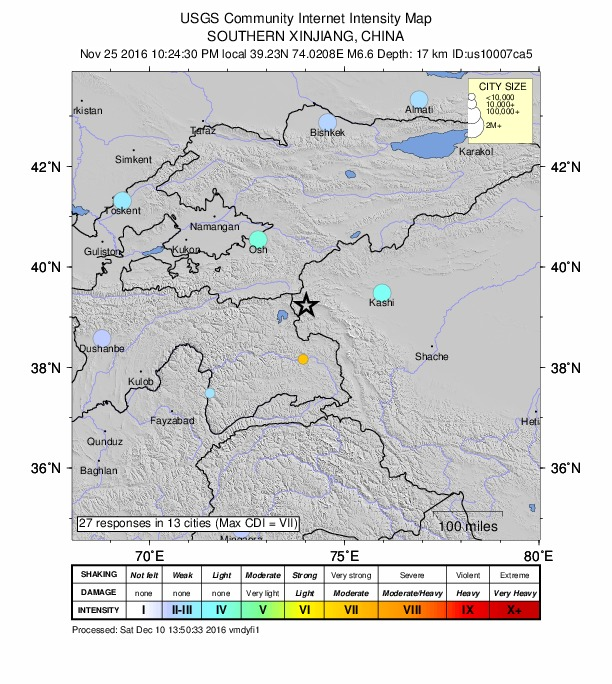
- Map from the United States Geological Survey showing the Did You Feel It? intensity distribution for this earthquake, with the epicenter marked by a black star.

- Location within Southern Xinjiang
- UTC time: 2016-11-25 14:24:30 Needs 'yyyy-mm-dd hh:mm'
- ISC event
- USGS-ANSS
- Local date: 25 November 2016
- Local time: 22:24 CST
- Magnitude: M_{s} 6.7, M_{w} 6.6
- Depth: 10 km (6.2 mi) (CENC) 17.0 km (10.6 mi) (USGS)
- Epicenter: 37.459°N 78.154°E
- Type: strike-slip
- Areas affected: China Xinjiang; Tajikistan
- Total damage: ¥463 million (CNY)
- Max. intensity: CSIS VII; MMI VII (Very strong)
- Peak acceleration: 31.3 gal (Wuqia County)
- Foreshocks: None
- Aftershocks: 520 (as of 27 November 2016)
- Casualties: 1 fatality

The 2016 Akto earthquake, also known as the 2016 Xinjiang earthquake, occurred on 25 November 2016 at 22:24:30 CST in western Akto County, Kizilsu Kyrgyz Autonomous Prefecture, Xinjiang, China. The earthquake measured 6.7 and 6.6 on the surface-wave and moment magnitude scales, respectively. It occurred at a depth of 10 km (6.2 mi). The earthquake resulted in one fatality and left approximately 11,000 people homeless.

== Tectonic setting ==
Mainland China is located on the eastern margin of the Eurasian seismic belt. The eastern and southwestern parts of the mainland are respectively affected by the convergence of the Pacific Plate and the Indian Plate, resulting in frequent seismic activity and significant earthquake hazards. Xinjiang lies along the foreland zone where the Indian Plate subducts beneath the Eurasian Plate, making the region especially prone to earthquakes. Since the beginning of the 21st century, mainland China has experienced a period of heightened seismic activity. A series of major earthquakes have occurred in the North–South Seismic Belt and Xinjiang, including the 2015 Nepal earthquake. Following that event, a number of intermediate- and deep-focus earthquakes occurred in the western segment of the Himalayan seismic belt around the Hindu Kush and in its eastern segment around the Burmese Arc, indicating a strengthening of the northeastward compression exerted by the Indian Plate. The area where the epicenter of this earthquake was located had entered a prolonged period without earthquakes of magnitude 5.0 or greater following the June 1, 2012, 2012 Wuqia earthquake (M5.1). After the 2015 Pishan earthquake, overall seismic activity in Xinjiang declined markedly, and the frequency of earthquakes of magnitude 2.0 and above decreased rapidly.

The area near the epicenter of the earthquake is located at high altitude and is sparsely populated, but has historically experienced frequent strong earthquakes. Within 100 kilometres (62 mi) of the epicenter, 17 earthquakes of magnitude 6.0 or greater have been recorded, including four earthquakes of magnitude 7.0 or above: the 28 September 1944 Wuqia South earthquake (M7.0), the twin Wuqia West earthquakes of 15 April 1955 (M7.0), and the 11 August 1974 Wuqia Southwest earthquake (M7.3). The closest magnitude-7 earthquake to this event was the 1974 Wuqia earthquake, located approximately 25 kilometres (16 mi) from the epicenter. The most recent significant earthquake in the area was the 26 June 2016 2016 Kyrgyzstan earthquake (M6.7), which occurred about 58 kilometres (36 mi) from the epicenter of this earthquake. Historically, 86% of the fourteen earthquake sequences of magnitude 6.0 or greater recorded within 100 kilometres (62 mi) of the area were classified as mainshock–aftershock sequences, with the largest aftershocks reaching about magnitude 5.5. Although global seismic activity was relatively active around the time of the earthquake, an official from the China Earthquake Networks Center stated that uneven temporal distribution is a normal characteristic of global seismicity, with some periods experiencing concentrated earthquake activity and others remaining relatively quiet.

== Responses ==
According to the China Earthquake Networks Center (CENC), a strong earthquake struck western Akto County, Kizilsu Kyrgyz Autonomous Prefecture, Xinjiang, China, at 22:24:30 CST on 25 November 2016. The earthquake had an epicenter at 39.27°N, 74.04°E and a magnitude of M_{s} 6.7, with a focal depth of approximately 10 km (6.2 mi). The United States Geological Survey (USGS) reported slightly different parameters, locating the epicenter at 39.273°N, 73.978°E. The agency assigned the earthquake a magnitude of M_{w} 6.6 and estimated a focal depth of 17 km (11 mi). On the day following the earthquake, the China Earthquake Administration activated a Level III emergency response and dispatched a 20-member field team to the affected area to carry out emergency response operations.

== Analysis ==
Four days after the earthquake, on 29 November 2016, the emergency command headquarters for the 2016 Akto earthquake held a press conference in Artux and officially released the earthquake seismic intensity map. The earthquake rupture had a strike of 107° and a dip angle of 76°. It occurred near the western end of the Muji fault-depression basin in the northern Pamir Knot. The event was the largest earthquake in the Kongur extensional system since the 1895 Tashkurgan earthquake. The rupture length was estimated to exceed 77 km (48 mi), and the earthquake may have consisted of at least two rupture sub-events. The focal depths of the earthquake's aftershocks were mainly concentrated between 2 and 14 km (1.2 and 8.7 mi). Based on the spatial distribution of the aftershock sequence, researchers inferred that the rupture likely propagated from greater depths toward the surface.

According to previous earthquake investigations in Xinjiang and surrounding regions, earthquakes of magnitude 6.5 or greater are generally required to produce observable surface ruptures. Following this earthquake, a surface rupture zone approximately 1 km (0.62 mi) long was identified near the epicenter. Multiple extensional fissures ranging from 1 to 46 cm (0.4–18.1 in) in width were observed. Most of these ruptures were formed by north–south extension. Using waveform data from 53 earthquakes of magnitude 3.0 and above that occurred near the source region, Gao Rong and Xia Aiguo of the Xinjiang Earthquake Agency analyzed the source parameters of the earthquake sequence. They found that moment magnitude, source radius, and seismic moment increased with earthquake magnitude, showing a positive correlation. In contrast, corner frequency decreased as magnitude increased, indicating a negative correlation. The study also found that stress drop exhibited a multiscaling relationship with earthquake magnitude.

== Impact and relief efforts ==
According to local authorities, the epicenter was located in a mountainous area, and shaking was felt in Akto County. The epicenter was situated 169 km (105 mi) from Kashgar and 1,238 km (769 mi) from Ürümqi. A Kyrgyz resident of Kalaqi settlement in Bulake Village, Muji Township, was killed when his house collapsed. The earthquake also left approximately 11,000 people displaced. In the affected area, 41 houses collapsed, 55 houses were damaged with cracks, and 104 livestock pens were destroyed. The earthquake caused varying degrees of damage to rural housing, lifeline infrastructure, educational facilities, healthcare services, and the livestock sector. According to a post-earthquake damage assessment conducted under Chinese national standards, the earthquake caused direct economic losses estimated at 463 million yuan (US$67 million), while post-disaster reconstruction costs were estimated at 684 million yuan (US$99 million). Following the earthquake, railway authorities in Xinjiang suspended Train Nos. 7556, K9788, and 5820 on the Southern Xinjiang Railway pending inspections of the railway line. The earthquake was felt across parts of Central Asia. The United States Geological Survey (USGS) received 27 responses through its Did You Feel It? system, including reports from China, Tajikistan, Uzbekistan, and Kyrgyzstan. Based on these reports, the maximum reported intensity was VIII (Severe) on the Modified Mercalli intensity scale.

Within three days of the earthquake, relief supplies including blankets, tents, and medicines had been delivered to the affected area. Firefighters and paramilitary personnel assisted residents in recovering belongings from damaged and collapsed buildings. Temporary prefabricated housing units were erected, allowing displaced residents to move into shelters within five days of the earthquake before the onset of winter.
