= Jamaterek =

Jamaterek Township 加马铁热克乡 (Chinese) جامالتېرەك يېزىسى (Uyghur) جامالتەرەك ايىلى (Kyrgyz) Jiamatiereke
- Township
- Location of the township
- Coordinates: 39.2066895254°N 76.1073172178°E
- Country: People's Republic of China
- Autonomous region: Xinjiang
- Prefecture: Kizilsu
- County: Akto (Aketao)

Area
  - Total: 44 km^{2} (17 sq mi)

Population (2017)
  - Total: 11,398

Ethnic groups
  - Major ethnic groups: Uyghur
- Time zone: UTC+8 (China Standard Time)
- postal code: 845554
- Area code: 653022 204
- Website: www.xjakt.gov.cn

Jamaterek (Uyghur: جامالتېرەك يېزىسى, from Mandarin Chinese Jiamatiereke Chinese: 加马铁热克乡; pinyin: Jiāmǎtiěrèkè Xiāng) is a township of Akto County in Xinjiang Uygur Autonomous Region, China. Located in the northeastern part of the county, the township covers an area of 44 square kilometers with a population of 11,398 (as of 2017). It has 7 administrative villages under its jurisdiction. Its seat is at Bagla Village (巴格拉村).

== Name ==
The name of Jamal terek or Jamalterak is from Uyghur language, Jamal is a personal name, and terek means "poplar tree" (杨树). It is said that 250 years ago (about 1770s), there was a tall poplar tree in Tairegeilikehuoyila (台热给力克霍伊拉), near which lived a capable woman named Jamal Han (加馬汗), so the land was named after it.

== History ==
In 1955, Jamalterak was transferred to Akto County from Yengisar.

In 1962, a commune was founded (加马铁热克公社).

In 1967, the commune was renamed Shuguang Commune (曙光公社).

In 1984, the commune was renamed and made into a township.

== Geography ==
Jamaterek Township is located between the east longitude 76°36′ to 76°41′, and the north latitude 39°04′ to 39°29′. The township is to the northeast of the Akto County seat. It is bordered by Shule County to the east and south, by Pilal Township and Tortayi Farm (Chinese: 托塔依农场) to the west, by the 41st Regiment (41团) of the XPCC across Yuepuhu River (岳普湖河) to the north. Its maximum distance is 10 kilometres (6.2 mi) from west to east and 6 kilometres (3.7 mi) from north to south, with a total area of 44 square kilometres (17 mi^{2}), and a total arable land area of 2,240 hectares (5,500 acres). The seat of the township is 15 kilometres (9.3 mi) away from the county seat, though the driving distance between the two is 20 kilometres (12 mi).

Jamaterek Township is relatively flat, and has an average elevation is 1,302 metres (4,272 ft).

=== Climate ===
The township's climate is mild, and precipitation is scarce. The annual average temperature for Jamaterek Township is 17.5 °C (63.5 °F), and the frost-free period is typically 180 to 220 days.

== Administrative divisions ==
The township has the following seven administrative villages under its jurisdiction:

- Baghla Village (Bagelacun) (巴格拉村, باغلا كەنتى, باعلا قىشتاعى)
  - 39°12′11″N 076°04′36″E
- Hokmehelle Village (Wukamailicun) (乌卡买里村, ھۆك مەھەللە كەنتى, ۉكۉ ماحاللا قىشتاعى)
- Konahoyla Village (Kuonahuoyilacun) (阔纳霍伊拉村, كونا ھويلا كەنتى, كۅۅنۅ حويلو قىشتاعى)
- Qashboyi Village (Kashiboyicun) (喀什博依村, قاشبويى كەنتى, قاشبويۇ قىشتاعى)
- Qoshterek Village (Kuoshitierekecun) (阔什铁热克村, قوشتېرەك كەنتى, قوشتەرەك قىشتاعى)
- Sekkiz'eriq Village (Saikezi'airikecun) (赛克孜艾日克村, سەككىز ئېرىق كەنتى, سەگىز ارىق قىشتاعى)
- Turtay Village (Tuo'ertayicun) (托尔塔依村, تۇرتاي كەنتى, تۇرتاي قىشتاعى)

== Demographics ==
Historical population
Year	Pop.	±% p.a.
2000	9,591	—
2010	10,311	+0.73%

As of 1997, the population of Barin Township was 99.7% Uyghur.

== Economy ==
Livestock raised in Jamaterek include cattle, donkeys, and sheep. The township's economic is agriculture-oriented, with key sectors including animal husbandry, the fruit industry, and the planting of wheat, corn, cotton and other crops.

== Education ==
The township is home to one middle school, three primary schools, and four kindergartens.

== See also ==
- List of township-level divisions of Xinjiang
