= Barin Township =

Barin Township 巴仁乡 (Chinese) بارىن يېزىسى (Uyghur) بارىن ايىلى (Kyrgyz) Baren Township
- Township
- Location of the township
- Coordinates: 39.0978663295°N 75.7872937794°E
- Country: People's Republic of China
- Autonomous region: Xinjiang
- Prefecture: Kizilsu
- County: Akto
- Villages: 19

Area
  - Total: 1,087 km^{2} (420 sq mi)

Population (2017)
  - Total: 38,706

Ethnic groups
  - Major ethnic groups: Uyghur
- Time zone: UTC+8 (China Standard Time)
- Postal code: 845550
- Area code: 653022 202
- Website: www.xjakt.gov.cn

Barin Township (Uyghur: بارىن يېزىسى), also spelled Baren Township (Chinese: 巴仁乡), is a township of Akto County (Aketao), Kizilsu Kyrgyz Autonomous Prefecture (Kezilesu), Xinjiang Uygur Autonomous Region, China. The township is located on the western edge of the Taklamakan Desert, at the foot of the Pamir Mountains. Located in the middle west of the northeastern part of the county, the township covers an area of 1,087 square kilometers with a population of 38,706 (as of 2017). It has 19 administrative villages under its jurisdiction. Its seat is at Barin Village (巴仁村).

== Name ==
Barin Township is located between the Gez River (Gez Darya; 盖孜河) to the west and the Kushan River (K'u-shan Ho; 库山河) to the east. The word "Baihal" (拜哈勒), from the Arabic language, refers generally to the area between two rivers. The pronunciation of this word gradually evolved into the Uyghur word "barin", which became the name of Barin Township. Barin is transliterated into Chinese characters as '巴仁', which is read in Mandarin Chinese as Baren (pinyin-derived) and Pa-jen (Wade-Giles derived). Barin was also called Balong (八龍) during the Qing Dynasty.

== History ==
In 1955, Barin, formerly part of Yengisar, became part of Akto County.

In 1962, Barin Commune (巴仁公社) was established.

In 1962, Barin Commune was renamed Xianfeng Commune ('vanguard/pioneer commune' 先锋公社).

In 1984, Xianfeng Commune became Barin Township.

In April 1990, the Barin uprising occurred in the township.

== Geography ==
The township of Barin is located on the edge of the Taklamakan Desert and the Pamir Plateau, and is located between the Gez River and the Kushan River on the eastern slope of the Kunlun Range and the western edge of the Tarim Basin. It is located in the east longitude 75°27′- 75°52′, the north latitude 38°08′- 39°36′, southwest of the county seat Akto Town. It is bordered by Pilal Township, Yumai Township, Oytak Township, Kezilto Township, Bulungkol Township, and Shufu County and Yingjisha County. Its maximum length is 24 km from west to east, 66 km north to south, with a total area of 1,087 square kilometers and an arable land area of 2,940 hectares. Its seat is 17 kilometers away from the county seat.

== Administrative divisions ==
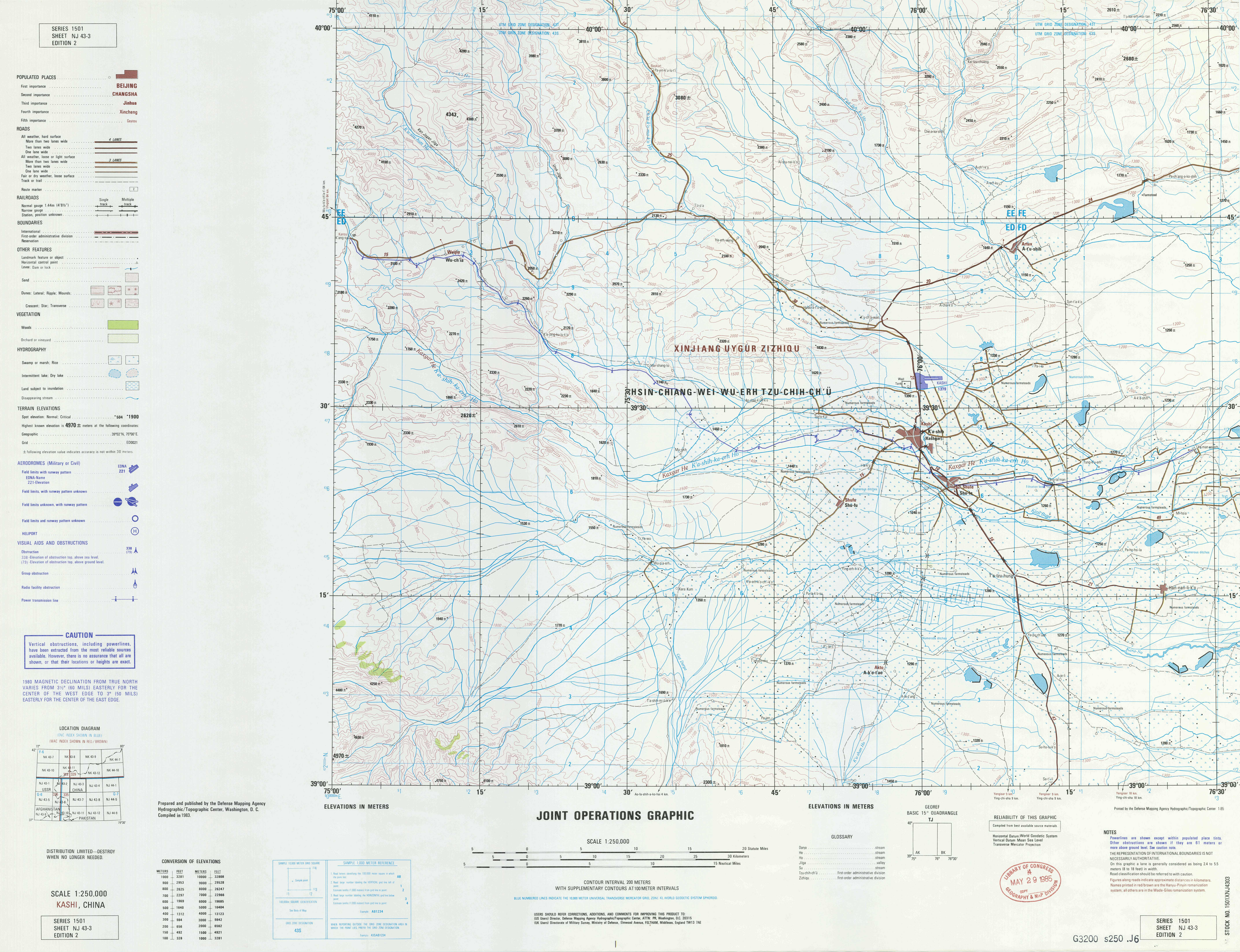
Map of the Kashgar area, including Barin (labeled as Pa-jen), between the Gez Darya and K'u-shan Ho (DMA, 1983)

The township has 19 administration villages.

19 administration villages

- Aramehelle (Aremailicun) (阿热买里村, ئارامەھەللە كەنتى, اارىماحاللا قىشتاعى)
  - 39°05′24″N 075°47′20″E
- Barin (Barencun) Baren, Barencun; (巴仁村, بارىن كەنتى, بارىن قىشتاعى)
  - 39°05′43″N 075°47′42″E
- Chike (Qiekecun) (且克村, چىكە كەنتى, چئيكە قىشتاعى)
  - 39°06′27″N 075°47′19″E
- Dongbagh (Dunbagecun) (墩巴格村 , دۆڭباغ كەنتى, دۅڭباق قىشتاعى)
  - 39°03′42″N 075°46′21″E
- Gulbag (Gulbagecun) (古勒巴格村, گۈلباغ كەنتى, گۉلباق قىشتاعى)
  - 39°02′16″N 075°48′31″E
- Hanterek (Hantierekecun) (汗铁热克村, خانتېرەك كەنتى, حانتەرەك قىشتاعى)
  - 39°05′23″N 075°45′10″E
- Ittipaq (Yitipakecun) (伊提帕克村, ئىتتىپاق كەنتى, ىنتىماق قىشتاعى)
- Jay (加依村, جاي كەنتى, جاي قىشتاعى)
- Nurbag (Nu'erbagecun) (努尔巴格村, نۇرباغ كەنتى, نۇرباق قىشتاعى)
- Qizilbayraq (Kezilebayilakecun) (克孜勒巴依拉克村, قىزىل بايراق كەنتى, قىزىل جەلەك قىشتاعى)
- Qizil'osteng (Kezilewusitangcun) (克孜勒吾斯塘村, قىزىل ئۆستەڭ كەنتى, قىزىل ۅستۉڭ قىشتاعى)
  - 39°05′14″N 075°45′49″E
- Qoghunchi (Kuohongqicun) (阔洪其村, قوغۇنچى كەنتى, قوونچۇ قىشتاعى)
- Qorghan (Ku'ergancun) (库尔干村, قۇرغان كەنتى, قورعان قىشتاعى)
  - 39°06′00″N 075°48′06″E
- Qum (Kumucun) (库木村, قۇم كەنتى, قۇم قىشتاعى)
  - 39°07′22″N 075°48′19″E
- Saybagh (Sayibagecun) (萨依巴格村, سايباغ كەنتى, سايباق قىشتاعى)
  - 39°04′57″N 075°46′17″E
- Tur (Tu'ercun) (吐尔村, تۇر كەنتى, تۇر قىشتاعى)
- Xinghuayuan (杏花源村)
- Yelken (Yelegancun) (也勒干村, يەلكەن كەنتى, جەلكەن قىشتاعى)
  - 39°03′54″N 075°46′06″E
- Yengimehelle (Yingmailicun) (英买里村, يېڭى مەھەللە كەنتى, جاڭى ماحاللا قىشتاعى)

Unincorporated villages

- Bekmahalla (拜克买里)

== Economy ==
Agricultural products of Barin include wheat, corn, and cotton, among others. Barin is known for its apricots and also grows sea buckthorn.

=== Baren apricot ===
Akto County was named as "Hometown of Baren Apricot of China" (中国巴仁杏之乡) by the Ministry of Agriculture in 2002 and by the National Forestry Administration in 2014. Baren apricot (巴仁杏) is one of the main fruits of local farmers planted, because of its highest yield and best quality in Barin, and is named after the place. Baren apricots are large, have much flesh, and are high in sugar. They are sweet and delicious and of high yield. It is a well-known local product of high-quality in Xinjiang. Barin Township is the core production area of Baren apricot. The local planting area of 933 hectares (14,000 mu), with 350,000 plants, had an output of 5,000 tons in 2018. The products are sold all over China through e-commerce platforms.

== Demographics ==
Historical population
Year	Pop.	±% p.a.
2000	25,103	—
2010	32,909	+2.74%

As of 1997, the population of Barin Township was 96.9% Uyghur.

== See also ==
- List of township-level divisions of Xinjiang
