= Ujme =

Ujme Town 玉麦镇 (Chinese) ئۈجمە بازىرى (Uyghur) ۉجمۉ شاارچاسى (Kyrgyz) Ojma, Yumai
- Town
- Location of the town
- Coordinates: 39.1272356413°N 75.9738081136°E
- Country: People's Republic of China
- Autonomous region: Xinjiang
- Prefecture: Kizilsu
- County: Akto

Area
  - Total: 194 km^{2} (75 sq mi)
- Elevation: 1,210 m (3,970 ft)

Population (2015)
  - Total: 26,107

Ethnic groups
  - Major ethnic groups: Uyghur
- Time zone: UTC+8 (China Standard Time)
- postal code: 845550
- Area code: 653022 200
- Website: www.xjakt.gov.cn

Ujme / Ojma (Uyghur: ئۈجمە يېزىسى or Yumai Chinese: 玉麦乡; pinyin: Yùmài Xiāng) is a town of Akto County in Xinjiang Uygur Autonomous Region, China. Located in the northeast of the county, the town covers an area of 194 square kilometers with a population of 26,107 (as of 2015). It has 15 administrative villages under its jurisdiction. Its seat is at Hoylaerik Village (霍伊拉艾日克村).

== Name ==
The name of Ujme (ئۈجمە) is from Uighur language, meaning "mulberry" (桑椹). Ujme is so named because are many mulberry trees in the area and the quality of the fruit of the mulberry trees is good.

== History ==
In 1955, Ujme was transferred from Yengisar County to Akto County.

In 1966, Ujme Commune (玉麦公社) was established.

In 1967 during the Cultural Revolution, the commune was renamed Dongfanghong Commune (literally "The East Is Red Commune": 东方红公社).

In 1984, the commune became Ujme Township.

In 2018, Silu Jiayuan neighborhood (丝路佳苑小区) in Ujme became the first community to test usage of a centralized heating system in Kizilsu Prefecture.

On December 10, 2021, Ujme township was upgraded to a town.

== Geography and resources ==
The town of Ujme is located between 75°51-76°08′ east longitude and 39°00′-39°10′ north latitude, in the alluvial plain of Kushan River (库山河) on the eastern slope of Pamir Plateau and on the western edge of Tarim Basin. The Kashgar–Hotan railway runs through the territory. Its maximum distance is 24 kilometers from west to east and 19 kilometers from north to south, it has an area of 194 square kilometers with the arable land area of 3,115 hectares. The seat of the town is 3 kilometers away from the southwest of Akto Town.

The average altitude of Ujme town is at 1,210 meters above sea level, it has a warm temperate continental arid climate with abundant sunshine, four distinct seasons, drought and little rain. There exists large temperature difference between day and night with the average annual temperature of 10.9 °C, the average temperature of 6.3 °C in January, the frost-free period of 200–240 days and the average annual precipitation of 70 to 120 mm. The main water channels are the Kunisak Channel (库尼萨克渠), Ujme Channel (玉麦渠) and Kogunqi Regulating Channel (阔滚其调水渠). Soil is mainly irrigated warped soil (灌淤土), suitable for farming, fruit and gardening.

== Administrative divisions ==
The town has 15 administration villages and 69 unincorporated villages.

15 administration villages

- Altunchi Village (Aletunqicun) (阿勒吞其村, ئالتۇنچى كەنتى, التىنچى قىشتاعى)
  - 39°05′57″N 076°00′49″E
- Amash Village (Amaxicun) (阿玛希村, ئاماش كەنتى, اماش قىشتاعى)
  - 39°06′51″N 075°59′48″E
- Beht Village (‌Baiheticun) (百合提村, بەخت كەنتى, باقىت قىشتاعى)
- Beliqchi Village (‌Bilikeqicun) (比力克其村, بېلىقچى كەنتى, بالىقچى قىشتاعى)
- Hoyla'eriq Village (‌Huoyila'airikecun) (霍伊拉艾日克村, ھويلا ئېرىق كەنتى, حويلو ارىق قىشتاعى)
- Janggal'awat Village (‌Jianggeli'awaticun) (江格里阿瓦提村, جاڭگال ئاۋات كەنتى, جەڭگەل اۋات قىشتاعى)
- Jayterek Village (Jiayitierekecun) (加依铁热克村, جايتېرەك كەنتى, جايتەرەك قىشتاعى)
  - 39°08′45″N 076°00′11″E
- Qash'eriq Village (‌Kashi'airikecun) (喀什艾日克村, قاشئېرىق كەنتى, قاش ارىق قىشتاعى)
- Qurbagh Village (‌Ku'erbagecun) (库尔巴格村, قۇرباغ كەنتى, قۇرباق قىشتاعى)
- Qonsaq Village (Kunisakecun) (库尼萨克村, قونساق كەنتى, قونساق قىشتاعى)
  - 39°07′20″N 075°59′10″E
- Langar Village (‌Langancun) (兰干村, لەڭگەر كەنتى, لەڭگەر قىشتاعى)
- Chaghra Village (‌Qiage'ercun) (恰格尔村, چاغرا كەنتى, چاقىرىق قىشتاعى)
- Ujme Village (Yumaicun) (玉麦村, ئۈجمە كەنتى, ۉجمۉ قىشتاعى)
  - 39°04′31″N 076°02′26″E
- Yengi'aymaq Village (Ying'ayimakecun) (英阿依玛克村, يېڭىئايماق كەنتى, جاڭى ايماق قىشتاعى)
- Yuqarqi Hoyla Village (‌Youkakehuoyilacun) (尤喀克霍伊拉村, يۇقارقى ھويلا كەنتى, جوعورقۇ حويلو قىشتاعى)

Unincorporated villages

- Kadirkorukmahalla (喀迪尔阔如克买里)
- Baymahalla (巴依买里)

== Demographics ==
Historical population
Year	Pop.	±% p.a.
2000	22,062	—
2010	25,832	+1.59%
2015	26,107	+0.21%

As of 1997, the population of Ujme Township was 86.9% Uyghur. As of 2015, the township has 6,679 households with a population of 26,107.

== Economy ==
The economy of Ujme is primarily agricultural. Ujme is the main food-producing area of Akto County. Silk worms and mulberry trees are cultivated in Ujme.

== See also ==
- List of township-level divisions of Xinjiang
