= Akto County =

Akto County: 阿克陶县 (Chinese); ئاقتو ناھىيىسى (Uyghur); ﺍﻗﺘﻮﻭ وودانى (Kyrgyz); Aqtu, Aktu, Aketao
- County
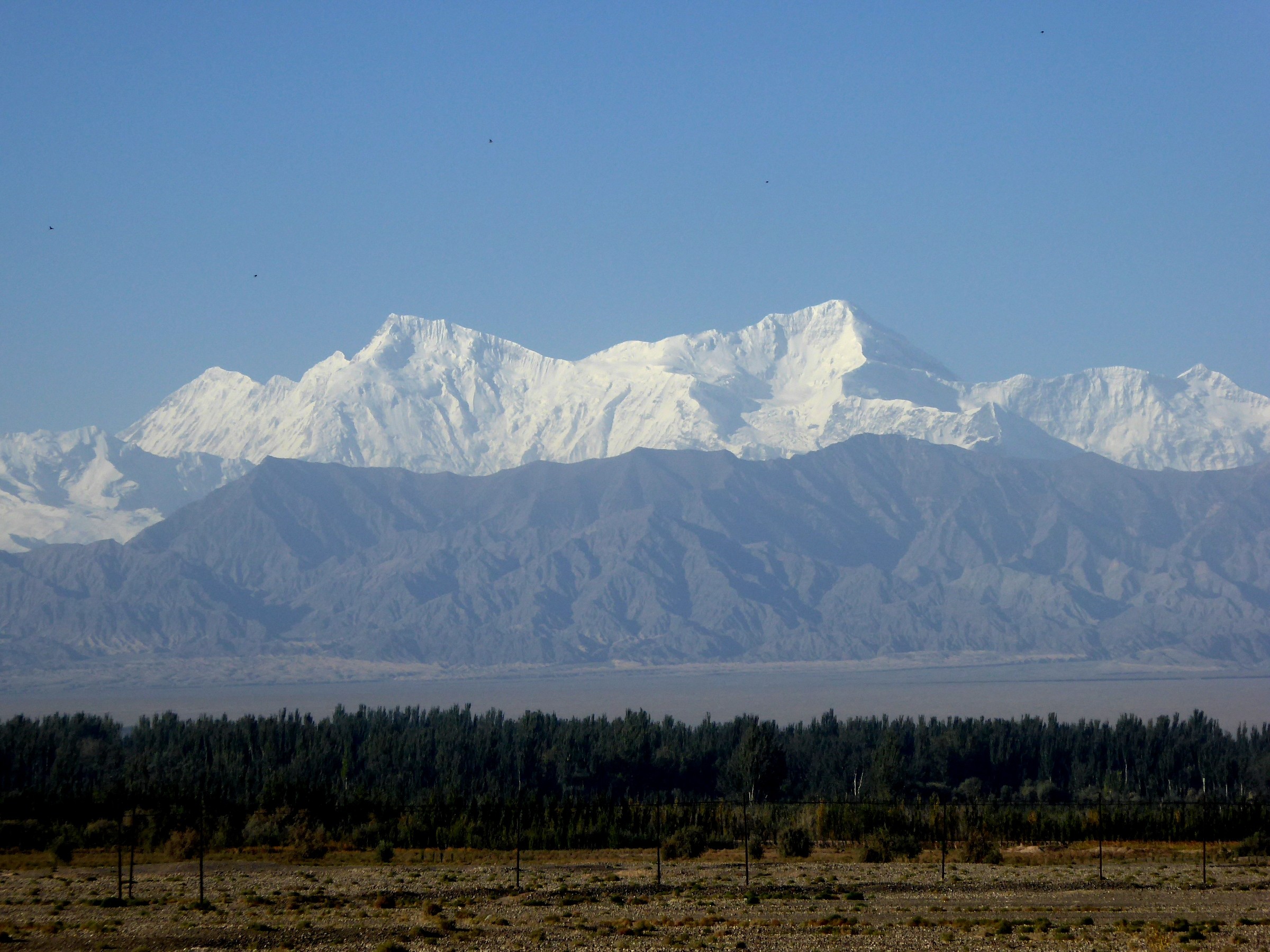
- Kongur Tagh from the Karakoram Highway

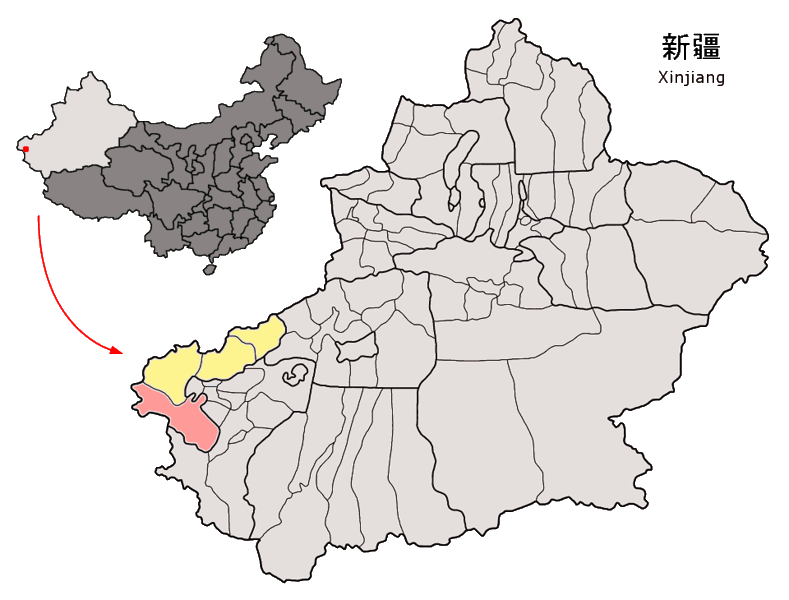
- Location of the county (red) in Kizilsu Prefecture (yellow) and Xinjiang

- Location of the seat in Xinjiang Akto (Xinjiang) Akto (China)
- Coordinates (Akto County government): 39°08′52″N 75°56′51″E
- Country: China
- Autonomous region: Xinjiang
- Autonomous prefecture: Kizilsu
- County seat: Akto Town

Area
  - Total: 24,176 km^{2} (9,334 sq mi)

Population (2020)
  - Total: 226,005
  - Density: 9.3483/km^{2} (24.212/sq mi)

Ethnic groups
  - Major ethnic groups: Uyghur, Kyrgyz
- Time zone: UTC+8 (China Standard Time (Note: Locals in Xinjiang frequently observe UTC+6 (Xinjiang Time), 2 hours behind Beijing.))
- Postal code: 845550
- Area code: 653022
- Website: www.xjakt.gov.cn

Akto County

Uyghur name
- Uyghur: ئاقتو ناھىيىسى
Transcriptions
- Latin Yëziqi: Aqto Nahiyisi
- Yengi Yeziⱪ: Aⱪto Naⱨiyisi
- SASM/GNC: Akto Nahiyisi
- Siril Yëziqi: Ақто наһийиси

Chinese name
- Simplified Chinese: 阿克陶县
- Traditional Chinese: 阿克陶縣
Transcriptions
Standard Mandarin
- Hanyu Pinyin: Ākètáo Xiàn
- Wade–Giles: A¹-kʻo⁴-tʻao² Hsien⁴

Kyrgyz name
- Kyrgyz: ﺍﻗﺘﻮﻭ وودانى; Актоо ооданы Aqtoo oodanı

Akto County (also known as Aqtu, Aktu, or Aketao; Chinese: 阿克陶县; pinyin: Ākètáo Xiàn) is a county in Kizilsu Kyrgyz Autonomous Prefecture, Xinjiang Uygur Autonomous Region, China. The county borders Tajikistan and Kyrgyzstan and has five towns, six townships, one ethnic township, and five other township-level divisions under its jurisdiction. The county seat is Akto Town. The county has an area of 24,176 km^{2} (9,334 sq mi). In 2015 its population was 221,526; in 2017 it was 231,756.

Occupying the westernmost portion of China, Akto County is highly mountainous, with the Pamir Mountains and Kunlun Mountains both passing through the county. It is bordered by Ulugqat County and Shufu County to the north, by Shule County and 41st Regiment of the XPCC across Yopurga River (岳普湖河) to the northeast, by Yengisar County (Yingjisha), Yarkant County (Shache) to the east, and by Taxkorgan Tajik Autonomous County (Tashkurgan) to the south. The west and south-west share a border with Kyrgyzstan and a border with Tajikistan; the total border line is more than 380 kilometres (240 mi) long.

== Name ==
Akto means 'white mountain' in the Kyrgyz language, referring to snowy mountains.

== History ==
In the early years of the Western Han dynasty, the land of present-day Akto County was under the jurisdiction of three kingdoms of Shule, Puli (蒲犁国) and Yinai (依耐国). In 60 BCE, the Han dynasty set up the Protectorate of the Western Regions in Wulei City (乌垒城), in present-day Yeyungou Township in Luntai County, and Akto was placed under its jurisdiction. During the Three Kingdoms period, Akto was under the jurisdiction of the Wei State. During the Jin dynasty, the area, alongside Shule Kingdom, was subordinate to the Jin dynasty. In 658 CE, most of the area was placed under the jurisdiction of the Tang dynasty's Shule Governor Office as part of the Jimi system. In 840 CE, the Kara-Khanid Khanate, which included most of the area, was established. In 1134, the area, alongside much of the eastern portions of the Kara-Khanid Khanate, was absorbed into the Qara Khitai. The area was incorporated into the newly created Chagatai Khanate in 1226. In 1347, Tughluk Timur broke away from the Chagatai Khanate, and established the Eastern Chagatai Khanate, which included present-day Akto County. The area was one of the territories of Hudaida (忽歹达), a governor of the Eastern Chagatai Khanate. In 1514, the Yarkent Khanate, which included present-day Akto County, broke off of the Eastern Chagatai Khanate. In 1678, the area became part of the Dzungar Khanate. After the Qing dynasty put down the Revolt of the Altishahr Khojas in 1759, the area was successively governed by Kashgar and Yarkant ministers. In 1883, much of southern Xinjiang was restructured into prefectures and other civil administrative divisions. The area was placed under the Yingjisha'er Independent Subprefecture (英吉沙尔直隶厅), the Shule Independent Department (疏勒直隶州), and Yarkant Fu (莎车府).

=== 20th century ===
During the Republic of China period, the area of present-day Akto County was split between Yengisar County, Puli County (蒲犁县), Shufu County, and Ulugqat County. After the People's Liberation Army annexed the area in September 1949, the present Yumai Township (玉麦乡) was from the 6th district in Yengisar, Piral Township (皮拉勒乡) and Barin Township from the 7th district in Yengisar County, Kizilto Township (克孜勒陶乡) from the 8th district in Yengisar County, Qiarlon Township (恰尔隆乡) from 4th district of Qiarlon (恰尔隆第四区) in Puli County, Blunko Township (布伦口乡) from 5th district of Blunko (布伦口五区) in Puli and two townships of Bostanterak District (波斯坦铁热克区) in Wuqia County, Auytak Town (奥依塔克镇) from Auytak Township (奥依塔克乡) in Shufu County, Karekayqik Township (喀热开其克乡) from Qlukbash Township in Shufu.

Akto County was established in August 1954 from parts of Yengisar County, Shufu County, Puli County (present-day Tashkurgan Tajik Autonomous County) and Ulugqat County. In February 1956, Barin District 7 of Yengisar County was transferred to the jurisdiction of Akto County. In January 1977, Akto County was transferred to the jurisdiction of Kashgar Prefecture, and in July 1980, it resumed its original administrative affiliation.

In April 1990, the Barin uprising occurred in Barin Township.

In June 1996, Aisha Awazi, a Uyghur in the county highly critical of the Chinese government, was arrested in connection with reportedly appointing himself imam of a mosque in the county with the backing of 120 like-minded persons; he was listed as a political prisoner by Amnesty International.

=== 21st century ===
The 2007 Xinjiang raid occurred in the county.

In 2015, Chinese state media reported about a huge body of the Kongur Tiube glacier (7,530 metres) collapsing causing a 20 kilometres (12 mi) long and 1 kilometre (0.62 mi) wide ice rock avalanche.

It was the center of the 2016 Akto earthquake.

== Geography ==
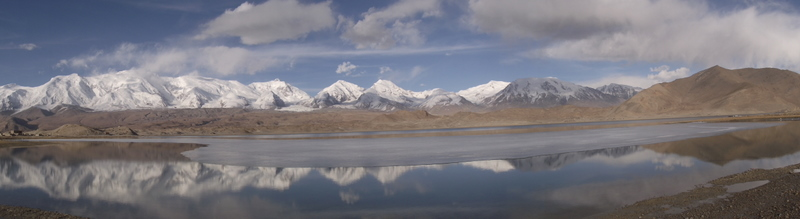
Karakul Lake

Akto County occupies the westernmost part of China, in the southwest of Xinjiang Uygur Autonomous Region, at the confluence of the eastern Pamir Mountains, the western edge of the Tarim Basin, and the northern slopes of the Kunlun Mountains. The county spans a total area of 24,176 square kilometres (9,334 sq mi).

It is located between east longitudes 73°26'5" and 76°43'31", and between north latitude 37°41'28" and 39°29'55". Its maximum length from north to south is 283.2 kilometres (176.0 mi) long, from the middle section of Maltabar Mountain (玛里他巴尔山) in the northwest to Kokluk Farm (科克鲁克农场) in the former Kosrap Township (now part of Qarlung) in the southeast. Its maximum length from west to east is 216 kilometres (134 mi) long, from Subash Village (苏巴什村) in Bulungkol Township in the southwest to the Jamaterak Township in the northeast.

Large parts of the county are subject to severe drought and erosion due to the bare mountains and sparse vegetation. Bare mountains in the area are formed from different types of rock, and may therefore be gray, black, yellow, red or white.

There are more than 40 glaciers distributed below the snow line, with ice sheets about 100 meters deep. Glacial meltwater is the main source of agricultural irrigation in the county, and it is also the main source of supply for the Gez River (盖孜河) and the Karatash River.

The northeastern part of the county is an oasis, located on the southwestern edge of the Tarim Basin. There are two major agricultural plains in this area: one along an alluvial fan from the Pamir Mountains, and the other along the delta formed by the Gez and Karatash rivers. These two plains belong to the wider Kashgar River delta and form an oasis on the southwest edge of the Tarim Basin. This delta is located in the southern part of the Kashgar Plain (喀什噶尔平原), along the northern slops of the Pamir and Kunlun mountain ranges, and covers an area of about 800 square kilometres (310 sq mi). This area includes many farming areas near Akto, Ujme, Barin Township, Pilal Township, and Jamaterek Township. The area is flat, at an altitude of about 1,200–1,500 metres (3,900–4,900 ft).

=== Mountains ===
Akto County is largely mountainous, with a 2018 government publication stating that mountainous areas account for 96.4% of the county's total area. The terrain is generally higher in the southwest and lower in the northeast. Most of Akto County's mountains reach an elevation of 4,000–5,000 metres (13,000–16,000 ft) above sea level. The Kongur Shan and Muztagh Ata Massif sub-ranges of the Pamir Mountains are located within Akto County. The range extends southward to Tashkurgan County, and to the northeast into Yengisar and Kargilik counties. The Sarikol Range in the southwest generally reaches an altitude of about 4,500 metres (14,800 ft) above sea level. The northern slope of the Kunlun Mountains run through the southern part of Akto County, along the upper reaches of the Yarkand River.

The county's highest peak is Kongur Tagh, located in its central area, which reaches 7,719 metres (25,325 ft) above sea level. Muztagh Ata, another prominent mountain in the county, reaches an altitude of 7,541 metres (24,741 ft) meters, and is located along the boundary between Akto County and Tashkurgan County. The top of the mountain is capped in ice and snow, and the thickness of snow is more than 100 metres (330 ft). Another mountain, Kongur Tiube, reaches an elevation of 7,530 metres (24,700 ft). Kungay Mountain (昆盖山), in the northwest along the border with Ulugqat County, reaches an elevation of 5,753.7 metres (18,877 ft) above sea level. There are 66 snow-capped peaks in the territory, including 36 larger peaks. These mountaintops have snow year round, and there are glaciers of different sizes around the peaks.

=== Climate ===
Climate data for Akto, elevation 1,325 m (4,347 ft), (1991–2020 normals, extremes 1991–present)
| Month | Jan | Feb | Mar | Apr | May | Jun | Jul | Aug | Sep | Oct | Nov | Dec | Year |
|---|---|---|---|---|---|---|---|---|---|---|---|---|---|
| Record high °C (°F) | 19.6 (67.3) | 25.9 (78.6) | 29.2 (84.6) | 34.7 (94.5) | 34.5 (94.1) | 38.0 (100.4) | 39.6 (103.3) | 38.5 (101.3) | 34.2 (93.6) | 31.3 (88.3) | 25.8 (78.4) | 19.2 (66.6) | 39.6 (103.3) |
| Mean daily maximum °C (°F) | 0.0 (32.0) | 5.9 (42.6) | 15.0 (59.0) | 22.9 (73.2) | 27.0 (80.6) | 30.8 (87.4) | 32.2 (90.0) | 30.6 (87.1) | 26.6 (79.9) | 20.2 (68.4) | 11.4 (52.5) | 2.0 (35.6) | 18.7 (65.7) |
| Daily mean °C (°F) | −6.5 (20.3) | −0.6 (30.9) | 8.0 (46.4) | 15.1 (59.2) | 18.9 (66.0) | 22.4 (72.3) | 24.0 (75.2) | 22.5 (72.5) | 18.0 (64.4) | 11.0 (51.8) | 3.1 (37.6) | −4.1 (24.6) | 11.0 (51.8) |
| Mean daily minimum °C (°F) | −12.1 (10.2) | −6.4 (20.5) | 1.4 (34.5) | 7.7 (45.9) | 11.5 (52.7) | 14.6 (58.3) | 16.5 (61.7) | 15.5 (59.9) | 10.9 (51.6) | 3.9 (39.0) | −3.0 (26.6) | −8.6 (16.5) | 4.3 (39.8) |
| Record low °C (°F) | −26.6 (−15.9) | −26.5 (−15.7) | −14.1 (6.6) | −1.8 (28.8) | 2.4 (36.3) | 5.6 (42.1) | 7.3 (45.1) | 7.5 (45.5) | 0.5 (32.9) | −4.3 (24.3) | −13.1 (8.4) | −23.7 (−10.7) | −26.6 (−15.9) |
| Average precipitation mm (inches) | 4.0 (0.16) | 7.2 (0.28) | 8.1 (0.32) | 5.6 (0.22) | 16.3 (0.64) | 13.7 (0.54) | 12.9 (0.51) | 13.1 (0.52) | 10.5 (0.41) | 5.4 (0.21) | 2.8 (0.11) | 2.9 (0.11) | 102.5 (4.03) |
| Average precipitation days (≥ 0.1 mm) | 2.6 | 2.4 | 2.2 | 2.2 | 4.1 | 5.3 | 4.6 | 5.2 | 3.5 | 1.5 | 0.9 | 2.2 | 36.7 |
| Average snowy days | 6.1 | 4.1 | 1.4 | 0.1 | 0 | 0 | 0 | 0 | 0 | 0 | 0.9 | 5.4 | 18 |
| Average relative humidity (%) | 70 | 62 | 51 | 44 | 49 | 50 | 55 | 62 | 66 | 67 | 65 | 74 | 60 |
| Mean monthly sunshine hours | 140.9 | 153.6 | 183.8 | 210.2 | 252.8 | 299.7 | 301.9 | 269.2 | 240.7 | 228.2 | 180.5 | 134.9 | 2,596.4 |
| Percentage possible sunshine | 46 | 50 | 49 | 52 | 57 | 67 | 68 | 65 | 66 | 67 | 61 | 46 | 58 |
Source: China Meteorological Administration all-time January highall-time February high

== Administrative divisions ==
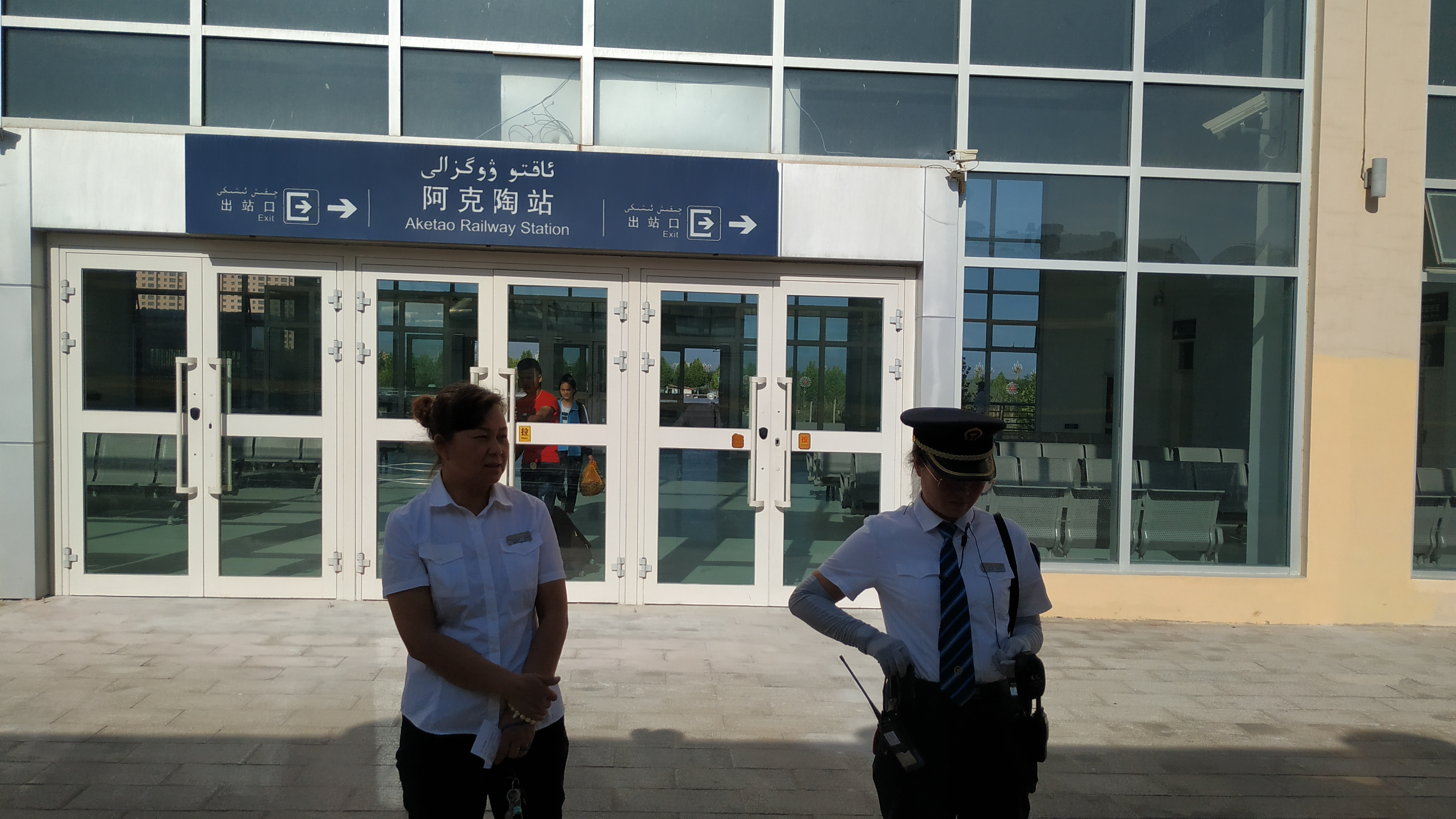
Akto railway station

The county has 12 township-level administrative divisions under its jurisdiction, including five state-owned farms.

| Name | Simplified Chinese | Hanyu Pinyin | Uyghur (UEY) | Uyghur Latin (ULY) | Kyrgyz (Arabic script) | Kyrgyz (Cyrillic script) | Administrative division code |
|---|---|---|---|---|---|---|---|
Towns
| Akto Town | 阿克陶镇 | Ākètáo Zhèn | ئاقتو بازىرى | Aqto baziri | ﺍﻗﺘﻮﻭ شاارچاسى | Ак-Тоо шаарчасы | 653022100 |
| Oytak Town | 奥依塔克镇 | Àoyītǎkè Zhèn | ئويتاغ بازىرى | Oytagh baziri | ويتوو شاارچاسى | Ой-Тоо шаарчасы | 653022101 |
| Kizilto Town | 克孜勒陶镇 | Kèzīlètáo Zhèn | قىزىلتو بازىرى | qizilto baziri | قىزىلتوو شاارچاسى | Кызыл-Тоо шаарчасы | 653022102 |
| Qarlung Town | 恰尔隆镇 | Qià'ěrlóng Zhèn | چارلۇڭ بازىرى | charlung baziri | چارلىڭ شاارچاسى | Чарлың шаарчасы | 653022103 |
| Ujme Town (Ojma Town) | 玉麦镇 | Yùmài Zhèn | ئۈجمە بازىرى | Üjme baziri | ۉجمۉ شاارچاسى | Yжмү шаарчасы | 653022104 |
Townships
| Pilal Township | 皮拉勒乡 | Pílālè Xiāng | پىلال يېزىسى | pilal yëzisi | پىلال ايىلى | Пылал айылы | 653022201 |
| Barin Township | 巴仁乡 | Bārén Xiāng | بارىن يېزىسى | barin yëzisi | بارىن ايىلى | Барын айылы | 653022202 |
| Karakeqik Township | 喀热开其克乡 | Kārèkāiqíkè Xiāng | قاراكېچىك يېزىسى | qarakëchik yëzisi | قاراكەچۉۉ ايىلى | Кара-Кечүү айылы | 653022203 |
| Jamaterek Township | 加马铁热克乡 | Jiāmǎtiěrèkè Xiāng | جامالتېرەك يېزىسى | jamaltërek yëzisi | جامالتەرەك ايىلى | Жамал-Терек айылы | 653022204 |
| Muji Township | 木吉乡 | Mùjí Xiāng | مۇجى يېزىسى | muji yëzisi | موجۇ ايىلى | Можу айылы | 653022205 |
| Bulungkol Township | 布伦口乡 | Bùlúnkǒu Xiāng | بۇلۇڭكۆل يېزىسى | bulungköl yëzisi | بۇلۇڭكۅل ايىلى | Булуң-Көл айылы | 653022206 |
Ethnic Township
| Tar Tajik Ethnic Township | 塔尔塔吉克民族乡 | Tǎ'ěr Tǎjíkè Mínzúxiāng | تار تاجىك مىللىي يېزىسى | tar tajik milliy yëzisi | تار تاجئك ۇلۇتتۇق ايىلى | Тар Тажик улуттуқ айылы | 653022210 |

The county's five township-level farms are as follows:

- Turtay Farm (托尔塔依农场, Uyghur: تۇرتاي دېھقانچىلىق مەيدانى, Kyrgyz: تۇرتاي دىيقانچىلىق مايدانى)
- Aktala Pasture (阿克达拉牧场, Uyghur: ئاقدالا چارۋىچىلىق مەيدانى, Kyrgyz: اقدالا چارباچىلىق مايدانى)
- Akto Seed Stock Station (阿克陶县原种场, Uyghur: ئاقتو ناھىيەسىنىڭ ئەسلى ئۇرۇمچىلىق مەيدانى, Kyrgyz: ﺍﻗﺘﻮﻭ وودانىنىن تۇپقۇ اسىل تۇقۇم مايدانى)
- Kizilsu Prefectural Tree Farm (克孜勒苏柯尔克孜自治州林场, Uyghur: قىزىلسۇ ۋىلايەتلىك ئورمانچىلىق مەيدانى, Kyrgyz: قىزىلسۇۇ ايماقتىق توقوي چارباسى مايدانى)
- Kizilsu Prefectural Plant Nursery (克孜勒苏柯尔克孜自治州苗甫, Uyghur: قىزىلسۇ ۋىلايەتلىك كۆچەت تىكىش باغچىسى, Kyrgyz: قىزىلسۇۇ ايماقتىق كۅچۅت وتۇرعۇزۇۇ باقچاسى)

== Demographics ==
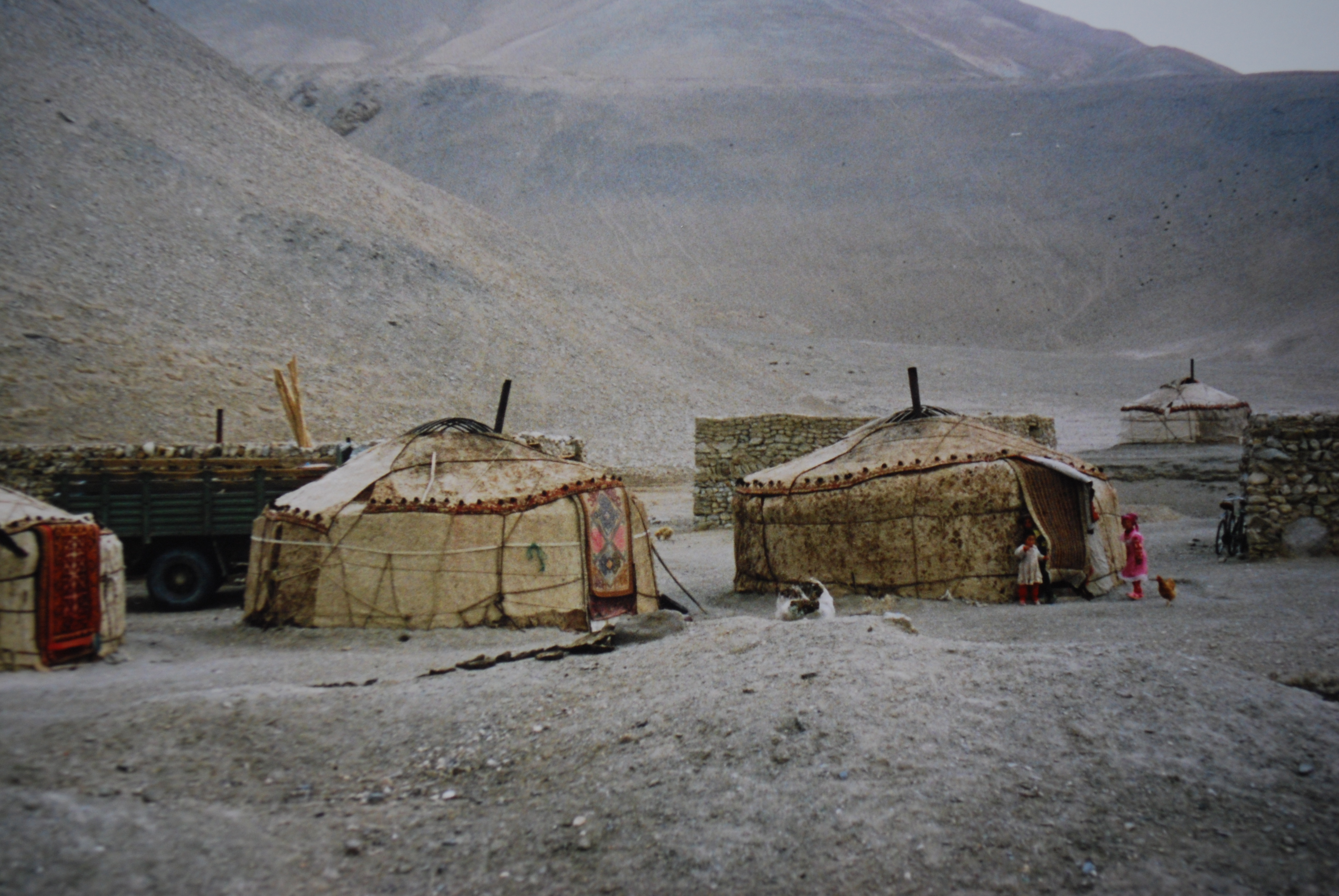
A Kyrgyz yurt in Akto County

In 2015 its population was 221,526; in 2017 it was 231,756.

Akto County has a large Uyghur majority, numbering 172,408 in 2018, or 73.64% of the county's population. The largest minority in Akto County are the Kyrgyz (including the Akto Turkmens), who number 47,394 in 2018, comprising 20.24% of the county's population. Other sizable minorities in the county include the Han Chinese and Mountain Tajiks, with populations of 7,864 and 6,018, respectively, comprising 3.36% and 2.57% of the county's population in 2018.

Akto County Ethnic Composition
| Ethnic group | 2015 | | 2018 | |
|---|---|---|---|---|
| Uyghur | 161,687 | 72.99% | 172,408 | 73.64% |
| Kyrgyz | 45,279 | 20.44% | 47,394 | 20.24% |
| Han Chinese | 8,347 | 3.77% | 7,864 | 3.36% |
| Mountain Tajik | 5,759 | 2.60% | 6,018 | 2.57% |
| Hui | 191 | 0.09% | 151 | 0.06% |
| Uzbek | 106 | 0.05% | 121 | 0.05% |
| Kazakh | 29 | 0.01% | 35 | 0.01% |
| Tatar | 32 | 0.01% | 34 | 0.01% |
| Mongol | 18 | 0.01% | 12 | 0.01% |
| Sibe | 6 | < 0.01% | 9 | < 0.01% |
| Manchu | 3 | < 0.01% | 6 | < 0.01% |
| Daur | 1 | < 0.01% | 1 | < 0.01% |
| Others | 68 | 0.03% | 72 | 0.03% |
| Total | 221,526 | 100.00% | 234,125 | 100.00% |

Akto County's population is unevenly distributed geographically, with the Gez-Kushan River Delta area hosting a population of more than 100,000.

== Economy ==
There are many jade mines in Akto County, largely along the upper reaches of the Yarkand River. Exposed jade stones in the Kunlun Mountains are often swept into the Yarkand River, which locals have historically collected from the river for thousands of years.

== Transportation ==
Akto is served by the Kashgar-Hotan Railway.

== Gallery ==
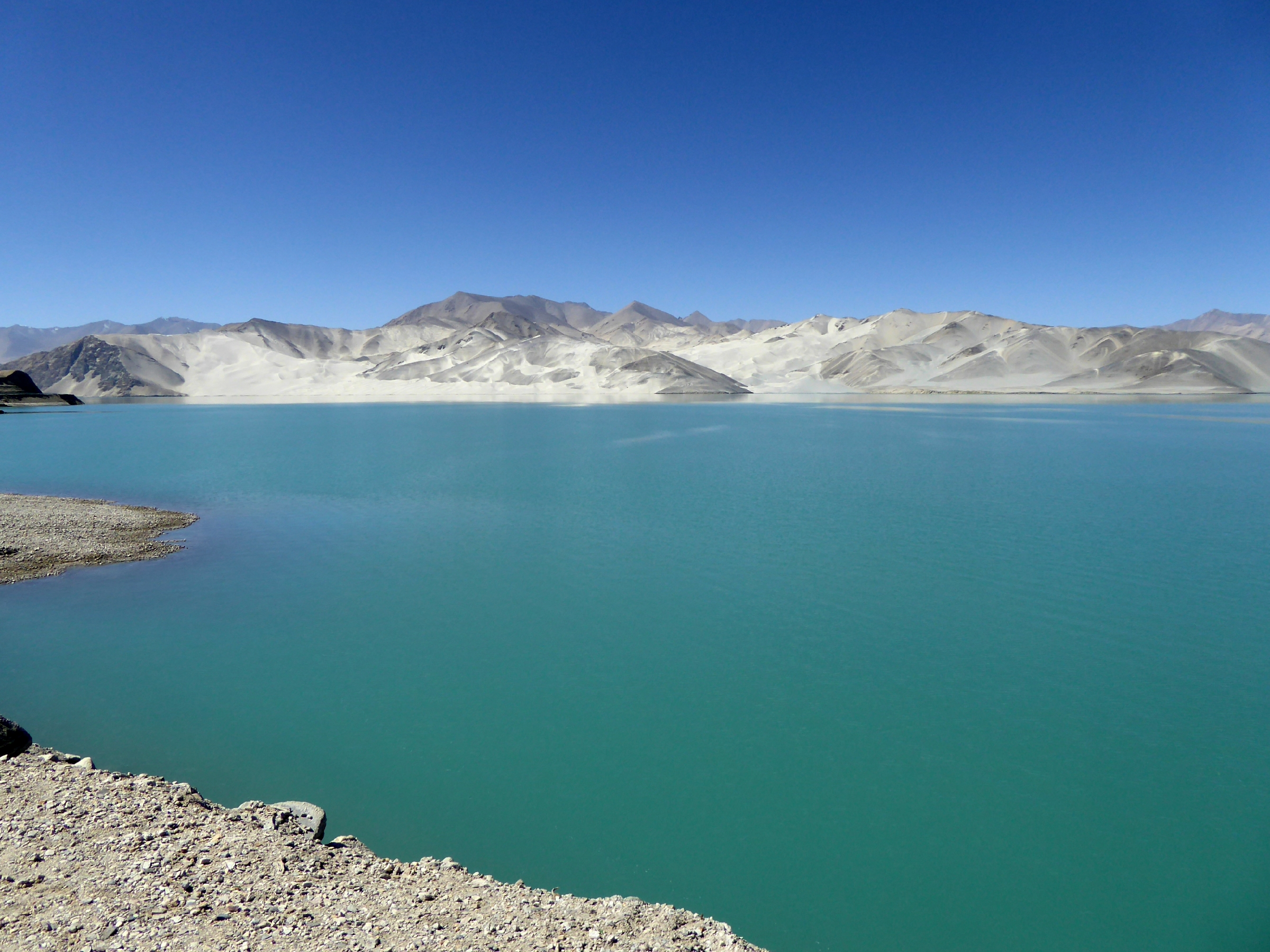
Baisha Lake in Bulungkol Wetland

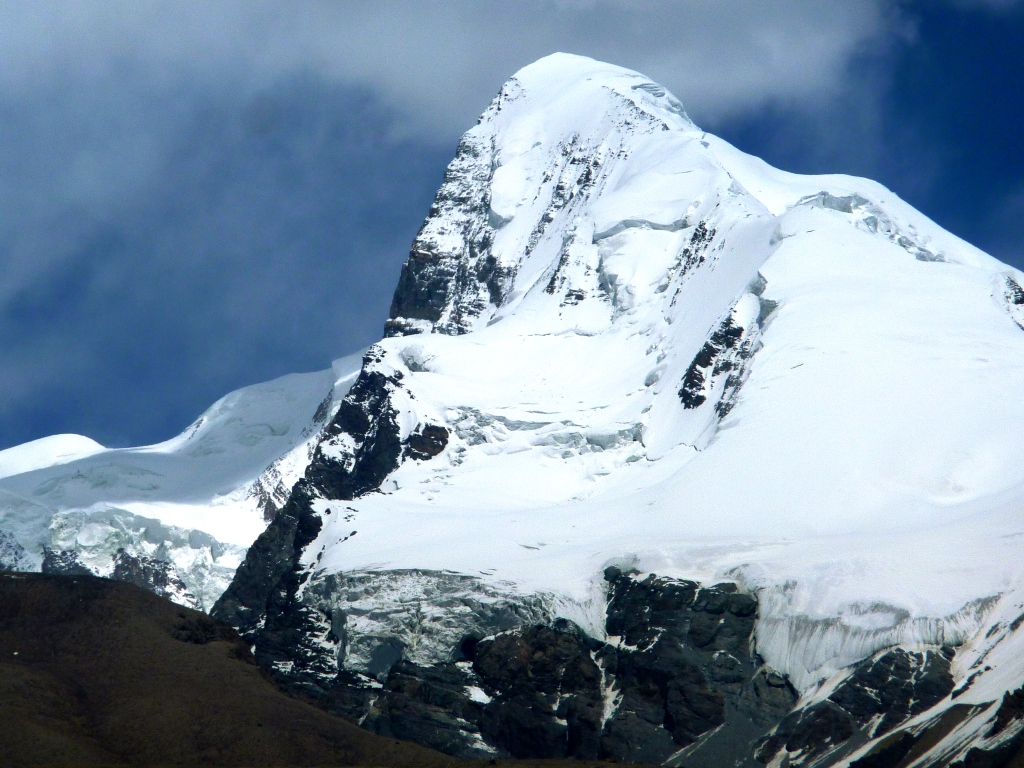
Kongurtah

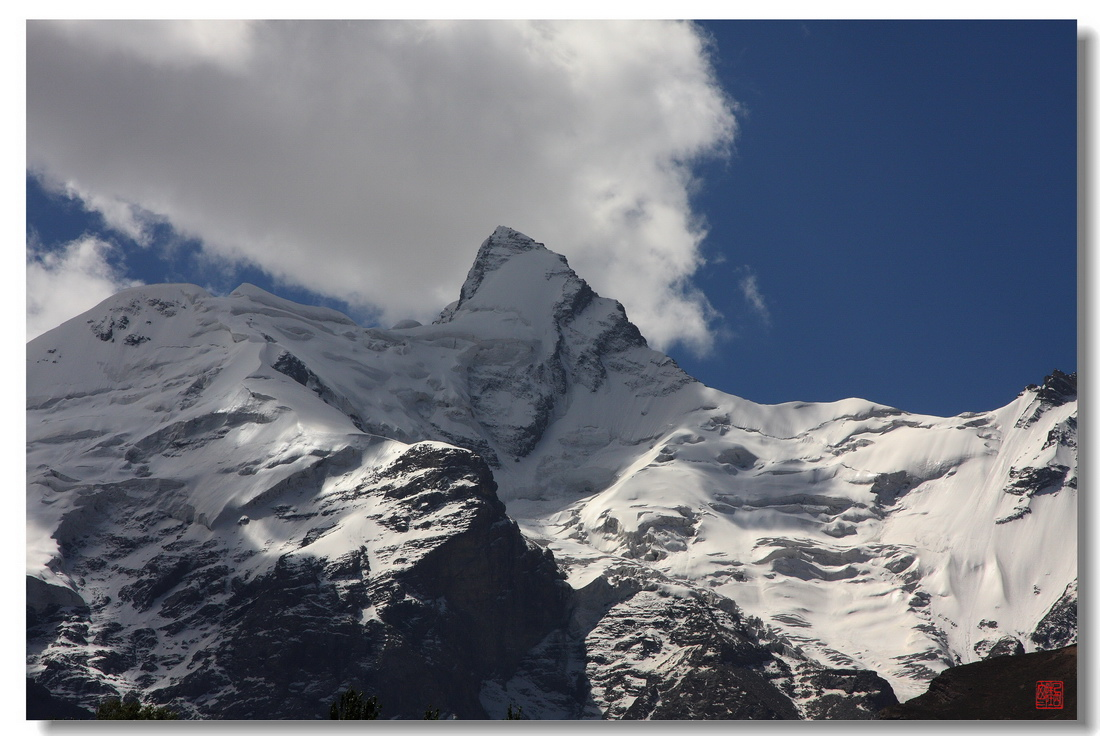
Kongurtah

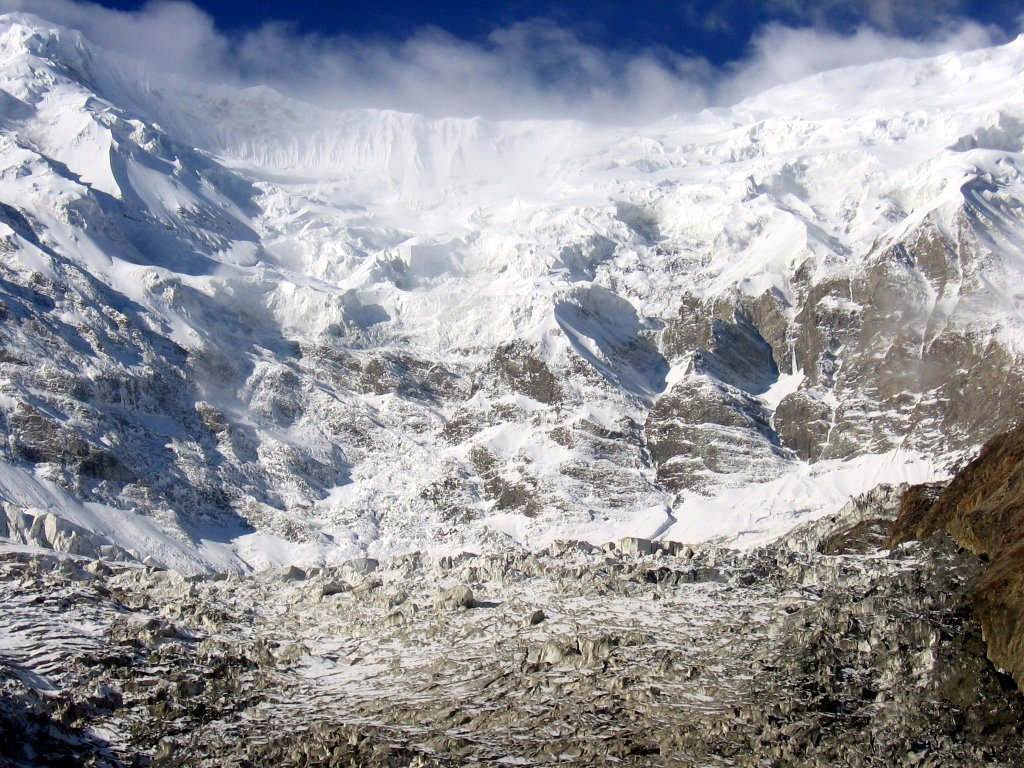
Glaciers in Oytak

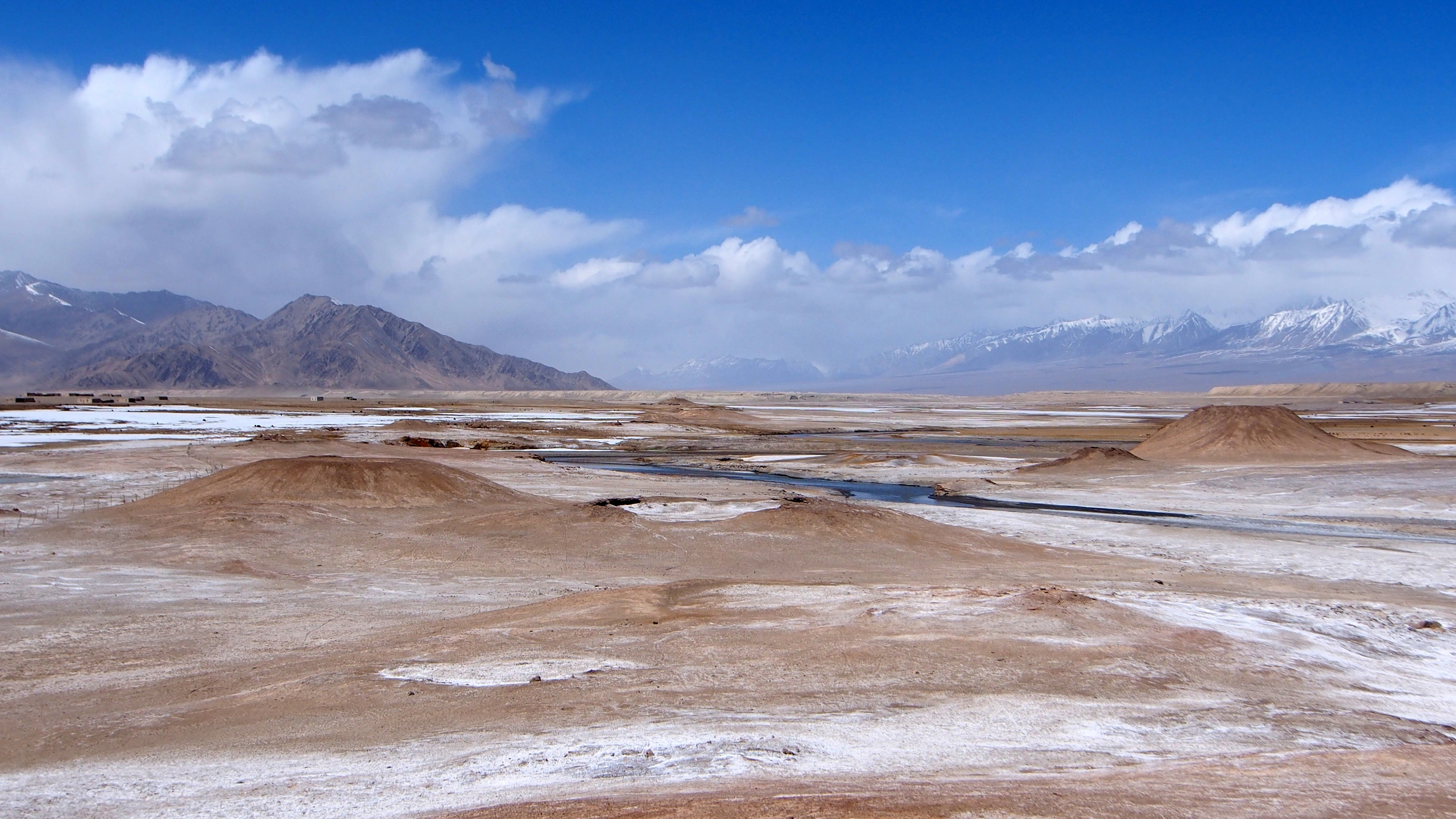
Volcanoes in Muji

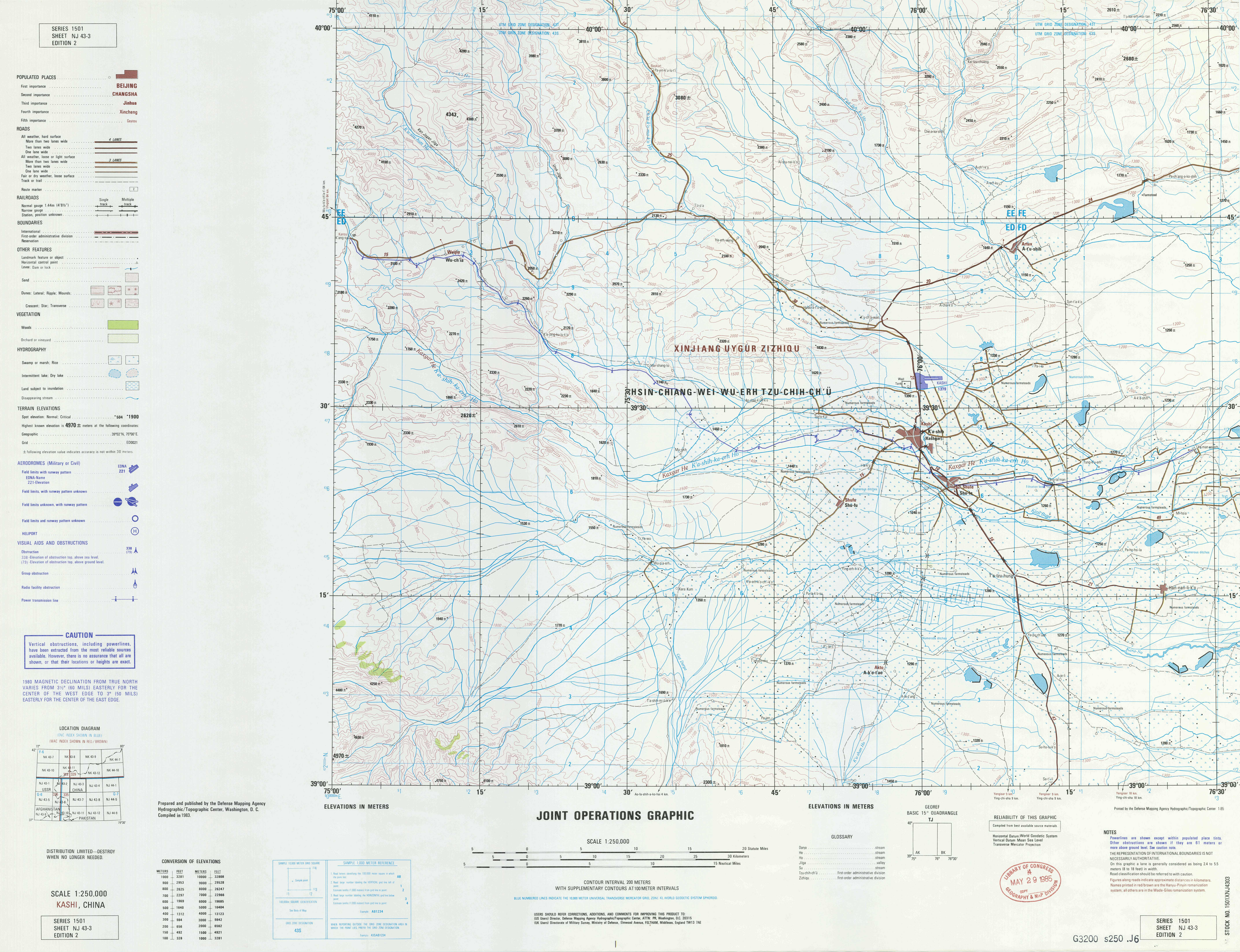
Map including Akto A-k'o-t'ao (DMA, 1983)

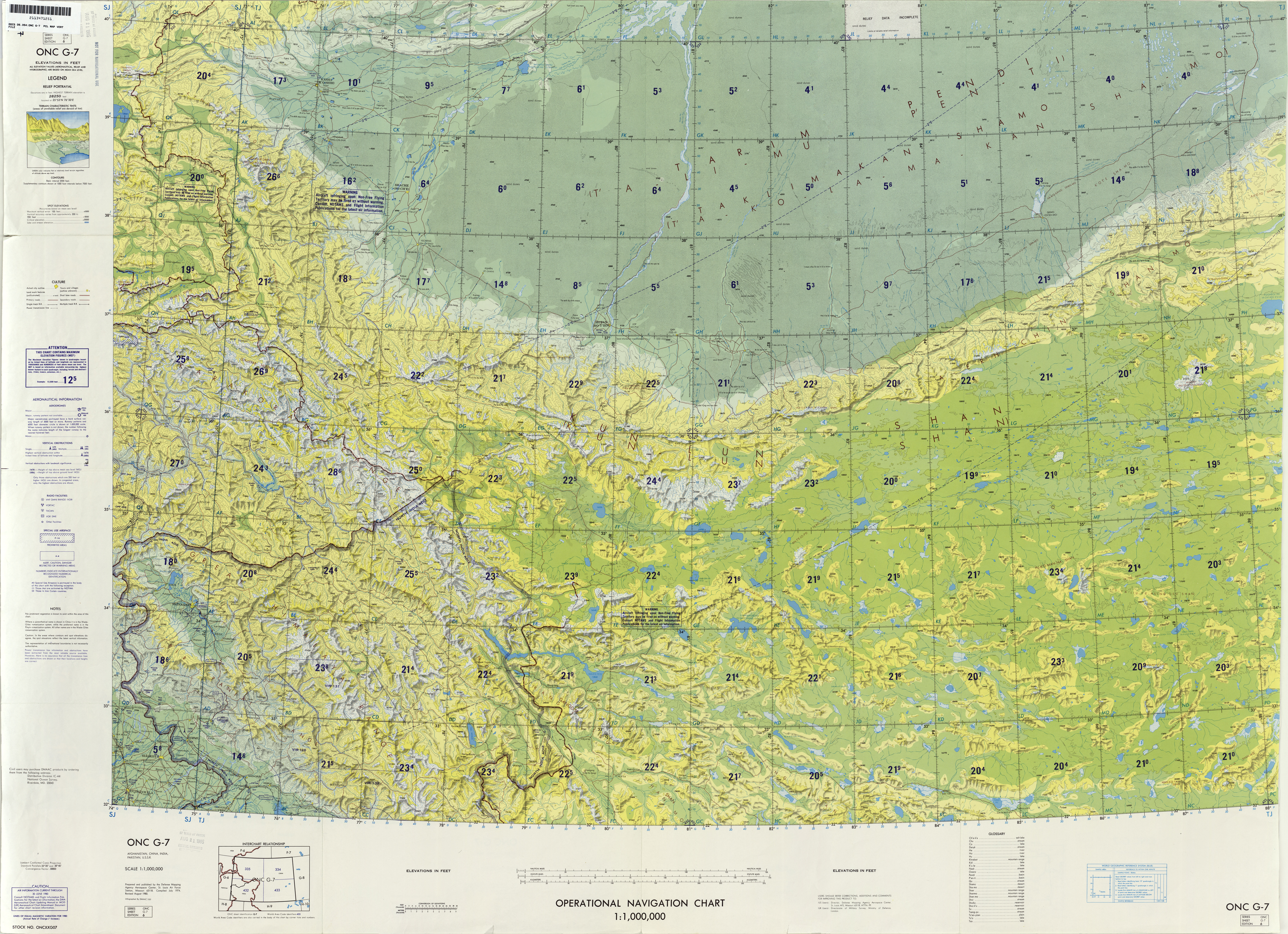
From the Operational Navigation Chart; map including Akto (A-k'o-t'ao) (DMA, 1980) (Note: From map: "The representation of international boundaries is not necessarily authoritative.")

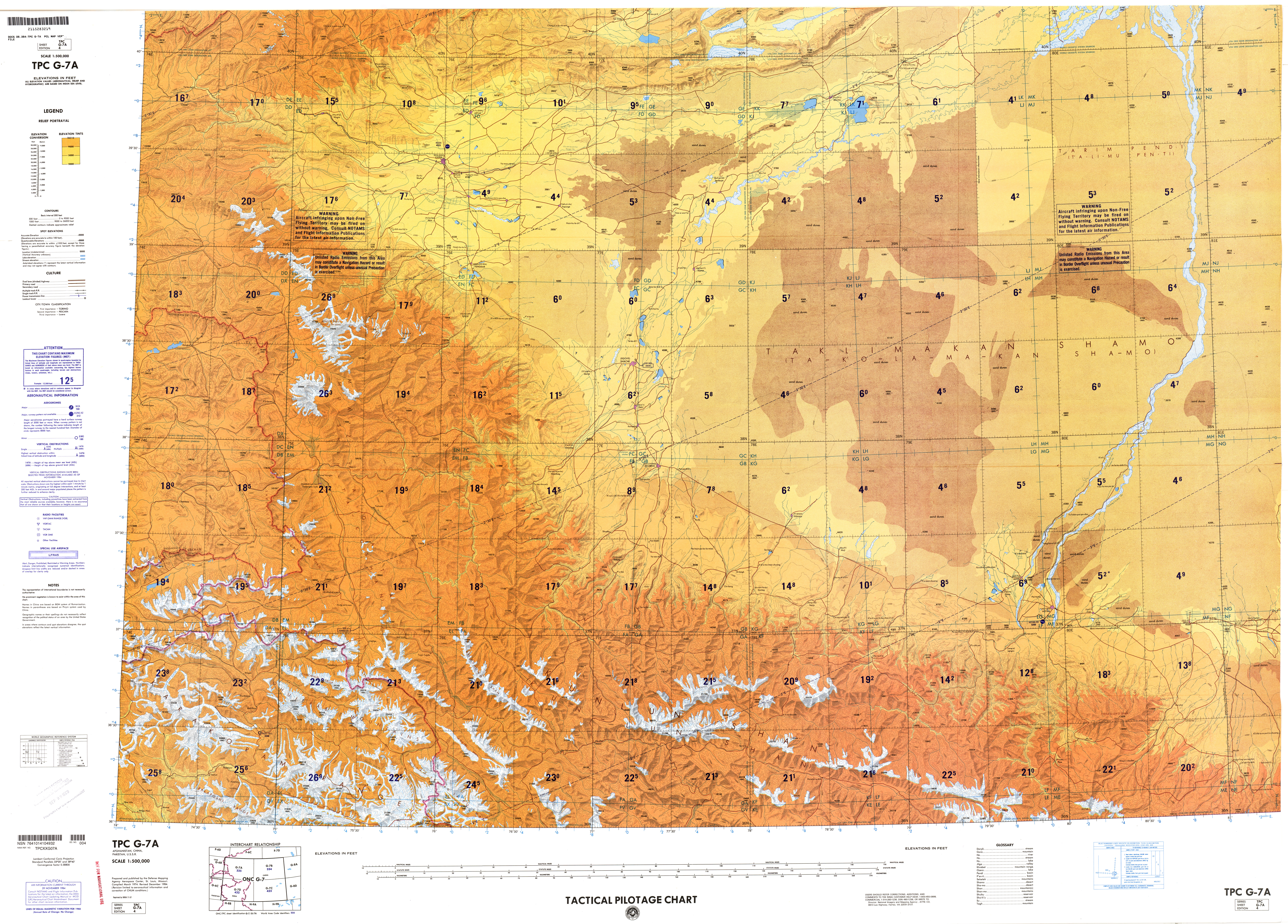
Map including (A-k'o-t'ao) Akto (DMA, 1984) (Note: From map: "The representation of international boundaries is not necessarily authoritative")

== See also ==
- China–Tajikistan border
- List of extreme points of China
