= Akto Town =

Aqto Town 阿克陶镇 (Chinese) ئاقتو بازىرى (Uyghur) ﺍﻗﺘﻮﻭ شاارچاسى (Kyrgyz) Aqto, Aqtoo, Aketao
- Town
- Location of the town
- Coordinates: 39°08′06″N 75°56′01″E
- Country: People's Republic of China
- Autonomous region: Xinjiang
- Prefecture: Kizilsu
- County: Akto

Area
  - Total: 136 km^{2} (53 sq mi)

Population (2017)
  - Total: 21,560
- Time zone: UTC+8 (China Standard Time)
- Postal code: 845550
- Area code: 653022 100
- Website: www.xjakt.gov.cn

Akto Town (Chinese: 阿克陶镇; pinyin: Ākètáo Zhèn) is a town and the county seat of Akto County in Xinjiang Uygur Autonomous Region, China. Located in the northeast of the county, the town covers an area of 136 square kilometers with a population of 21,560 (as of 2017). It has 19 communities and 9 villages under its jurisdiction, its seat is at Gumbez'eriq (拱拜提艾日克村,گۈمبەز ئېرىق كەنتى, كۉمبۅز ارىق قىشتاعى).

== Name ==
The name of Akto is from Kyrgyz language, meaning “White Mountain” (白山) and named after the oasis located under a snowy mountain.

== Geography ==
The town of Akto is located in the middle of the alluvial fan of the Kushan River (库山河) and its terrain is slowly inclined from the southwest to the northeast. The town is bordered by Pilal Township with the Baishikan Channel (拜什坎水渠) to the north, by Yumai Township to the southeast and by Baren Township with the Qiereke Channel (切热克水渠) to the west. Its maximum length is 11 kilometers west to east, the maximum length is 16 kilometers north to south, the total area is 136 square kilometers and the arable land area is 1,618.44 hectares. The town has an average elevation of 1,300 to 1,400 meters. It is a typical temperate continental arid climate with four distinct seasons, dry and less rain, with an average annual temperature of 11.2 °C and a frost-free period of 221 days. Farmland is distributed near urban areas.

== Administrative divisions ==
The town has 5 communities and 9 villages under its jurisdiction, with their respective Chinese, Uyghur, and Kyrgyz names.

5 communities

- Friendship Road (Youyilu) Community (友谊路社区, دوستلۇق يولى مەھەللىسى, دوستۇق جولۇ قوومدۇق قونۇشۇ)
- Happiness Road (Xingfulu) Community (幸福路社区, بەخت يولى مەھەللىسى, باقىت جولۇ قوومدۇق قونۇشۇ)
- Kongur Road (Gonggerlu) Community (公格尔路社区, قوڭۇر يولى مەھەللىسى, قوڭۇر جولۇ قوومدۇق قونۇشۇ)
- Old City Street (Laochengjie) Community (老城街社区, كوناشەھەر كوچىسى مەھەللىسى, كۅۅنۅشاار كۅچۅسۉ قوومدۇق قونۇشۇ)
- Unity Road (Tuanjielu) Community (团结路社区, ئىتتىپاق يولى مەھەللىسى, ىنتىماق جولۇ قوومدۇق قونۇشۇ)

9 administration villages

- Barin'eriq Village (巴仁艾日克村, بارىنئېرىق كەنتى, بارىن ارىق قىشتاعى)
- Cheqirterek Village (其克尔铁热克村, چېقىر تېرەك كەنتى, شىعىرتەرەك قىشتاعى)
- Gumbez'eriq Village (拱拜提艾日克村, گۈمبەز ئېرىق كەنتى, كۉمبۅز ارىق قىشتاعى)
- Noqutchi'eriq Village (诺库其艾日克村, نوقۇتچى ئېرىق كەنتى, نوقوتچۇ ارىق قىشتاعى)
- Orda'eriq Village (奥达艾日克村, ئوردا ئېرىق كەنتى, وردو ارىق قىشتاعى)
- Qaycha'eriq Village (喀依恰艾日克村, قايچا ئېرىق كەنتى, قايچى ارىق قىشتاعى)
- Yaghichaq Village (亚格恰克村, ياغىچاق كەنتى, ياعىچاق قىشتاعى)
- Yanchimehelle Village (央其买里村, يانچىمەھەللە كەنتى, يانچى ماحاللا قىشتاعى)
- Inchike'eriq Village (英其开艾日克村, يىڭچىكە ئېرىق كەنتى, ئچكە ارىق قىشتاعى)

== See also ==
- List of township-level divisions of Xinjiang
