= Aykol =

Aykol ئايكۆل يىزىسى 阿依库勒乡 Ayikule
- Township
- Location in Xinjiang
- Coordinates: 38°10′28″N 77°12′41″E
- Country: China
- Province: Xinjiang
- Prefecture: Kashgar / Kashi
- County: Poskam / Zepu
- Villages: 14

Area
  - Total: 59.2 km^{2} (22.9 sq mi)

Population (2010)
  - Total: 11,728
  - Density: 198/km^{2} (513/sq mi)

Ethnic groups
  - Major ethnic groups: Uyghur
- Time zone: UTC+8 (China Standard)

Aykol Township (Uyghur: ئايكۆل يىزىسى, Айкол; also Ayikule; Chinese: 阿依库勒乡) is a township in Poskam County (Zepu County) in the Kashgar Prefecture of Xinjiang, in northwestern China. Located 5.5 kilometres (3.4 mi) west of the main office of Poskam County Office, it lies on the southern bank of the Yarkand River.

== History ==
In 1961, Aykol Commune (阿依库勒公社) was established.

In 1984, Aykol Commune became Aykol Township.

In August 2013, at the end of Ramadan, violence erupted in Aykol.

On April 15, 2019, a farming cooperative was established in Bashösteng (Bashiwusitang).

== Administrative Divisions ==
Aykol includes fourteen villages and 69 village committees:

- Ittipaq (Tuanjie; ئىتتىپاق كەنتى / 团结村)
- Pichanchi (Piqiangqi; پىچانچى كەنتى / 皮羌其村) 38.219026°N 77.243011°E
- Qutay (Kutayi; قۇتاي كەنتى / 库塔依村) 38.204896°N 77.205201°E
- Paxtichi (Paheteqi; پاختىچى كەنتى / 帕合特其村) 38.188214°N 77.192912°E
- Zerepshan (Zelepushan; زەرەپشان كەنتى / 泽勒普善村)
- Bashösteng (Bashiwusitang; باش ئۆستەڭ كەنتى / 巴什吾斯塘村)
- Töwenghongrat (Tuowanwengrete; تۆۋەن غوڭرات كەنتى / 托万翁热特村)
- Talqichi (Talekeqi; تالقىچى كەنتى / 塔勒克其村) 38.166852°N 77.13436°E
- Yuqirighongrat (Bashiwengrete; يۇقىرى غوڭرات كەنتى / 巴什翁热特村)
- Nurbagh (Nu'erbage; نۇرباغ كەنتى / 努尔巴格村)
- Küybagh (Kuyibage; كۈيباغ كەنتى / 库依巴格村) 38.164768°N 77.177264°E
- Chinarliq (Qina'erleke; چىنارلىق كەنتى / 其纳尔勒克村)
- Ayköl (Ayikule; ئايكۆل كەنتى / 阿依库勒村) 38.171389°N 77.216484°E
- Aydingköl (Ayidingkule; ئايدىڭكۆل كەنتى / 阿依丁库勒村)

As of 2009, the villages of Aykol were: (Mandarin Chinese pinyin-derived names)

- Xiawuqituoma (下乌其托玛村), Piqiangqi (皮羌其村), Kutayi (库塔依村), Paheteqi (帕合特其村), Wulukeming (乌鲁克明村), Xiayidan (夏依旦村), Xiawengrete (下翁热特村), Talekeqi (塔勒克其村), Shangwengrete (上翁热特村), Ahetaqi (阿合塔其村), Kuiyibage (奎依巴格村), Shangkulegan (上库勒干村), Ayikule (阿依库勒村), Wuqituoma (乌其托玛村)

== Economy ==
A typical farming township, Aykol has an area of 3.65 million mu of cultivated land and is a major producer of grain, such as rice, wheat and corn, cotton, fruits and medicinal herbs.

In 2018, the township cultivated 12,000 mu of jujubes with an average of above 450 jin produced per mu.

== Demographics ==
Historical population
| Year | Pop. | ±% p.a. |
|---|---|---|
| 2000 | 12,761 | — |
| 2010 | 11,728 | −0.84% |

As of 1997, the population of Aykol was 75.8% Uyghur.

== See also ==
- List of township-level divisions of Xinjiang
