= Kosrap =

Kosrap كوسراپ 库斯拉甫 Kusilafu
- Abandoned town
- Location of the township
- Coordinates: 38°00′N 76°12′E
- Country: China
- Autonomous region: Xinjiang
- Prefecture: Kizilsu
- County: Akto
- Seat: Yengavati Village

Population
  - Total: 0
- Time zone: UTC+8 (China Standard Time)

Kosrap Township (Uyghur: كوسراپ يېزىسى, Kosrap Yëzisi; Chinese: 库斯拉甫乡; pinyin: Kùsīlāfǔ Xiāng) is a historic township of Akto County in Xinjiang Uygur Autonomous Region, China. It ceased to exist as a township and its territory was amalgamated to Qarlung Township on August 27, 2018. All the residents of the former Kosrap Township migrated to Dayasdun (大亚斯墩) in Zepu County. Meanwhile, the Tong'an Township (桐安乡) was established in Dayasdun of Zepu County on August 27, 2018, its seat is at Yengavati Village (英阿瓦提村).

== History ==
Since 1912, Kosrap had been the township of Puli County (present Taxkorgan). In 1950, Taxkorgan Tajik Autonomous County was established, and Kosrap was a township in the 2nd district of Taxkorgan. In September 1954, the Kizilsu Kyrgyz Autonomous Prefecture was established and Kosrap was transferred to Qarlung Township of Akto County from Taxkorgan. In 1961, the commune of Kosrap was re-established from Qarlung, and in 1965 it was merged into Qarlung. In 1981, Kosrap Commune was re-established. In October 1984, it was reorganized into a township. Because the residential area of the township is located in the Altash Water Conservancy Project (阿尔塔什水利枢纽工程) reservoir area, its residents needed to be moved to the adjacent Dayasdun (大亚斯墩) in Zepu County. On August 27, 2018, Kosrap was merged into Qarlung, while Tong'an Township (桐安乡) was formed in Dayasdun.

== Administrative divisions ==
Before its ceasing to exist as a separate division of township in 2018, Kosirap had 4 villages (as of 2017) with 19 unincorporated villages under its jurisdiction.

4 administration villages

- Akqig Village (阿克其格村)
- Kekluk Village (科克鲁克村)
- Yengiawat Village (英阿瓦提村)
- Zongtax Village (宗塔什村)

Unincorporated villages

- Kizilegil (克孜勒艾格勒)

== Resettlement ==
The township of Kosrap is located in the Altash Reservoir area. As one of the construction projects, its resettlement was started in 2017 and completed in 2018. The small town relocation and resettlement area of Kosrap Township for Altash Water Conservancy Project is located in Dayasdun (大亚斯墩) of Zepu County, 32 kilometers away from the county seat of Zepu County, and 8 kilometers away from Jinhuyang National Forest Park (金湖杨国家森林公园) at 5A level. It was planned to use 200 hectares of land for residential areas, 1,200 hectares of forage land, 1,067 hectares of reserved land, and 300 hectares of food grain land. 1,276 households with 4,543 people need to be resettled.

== See also ==
- List of township-level divisions of Xinjiang
