= Yarkand River =

River in the Xinjiang, China

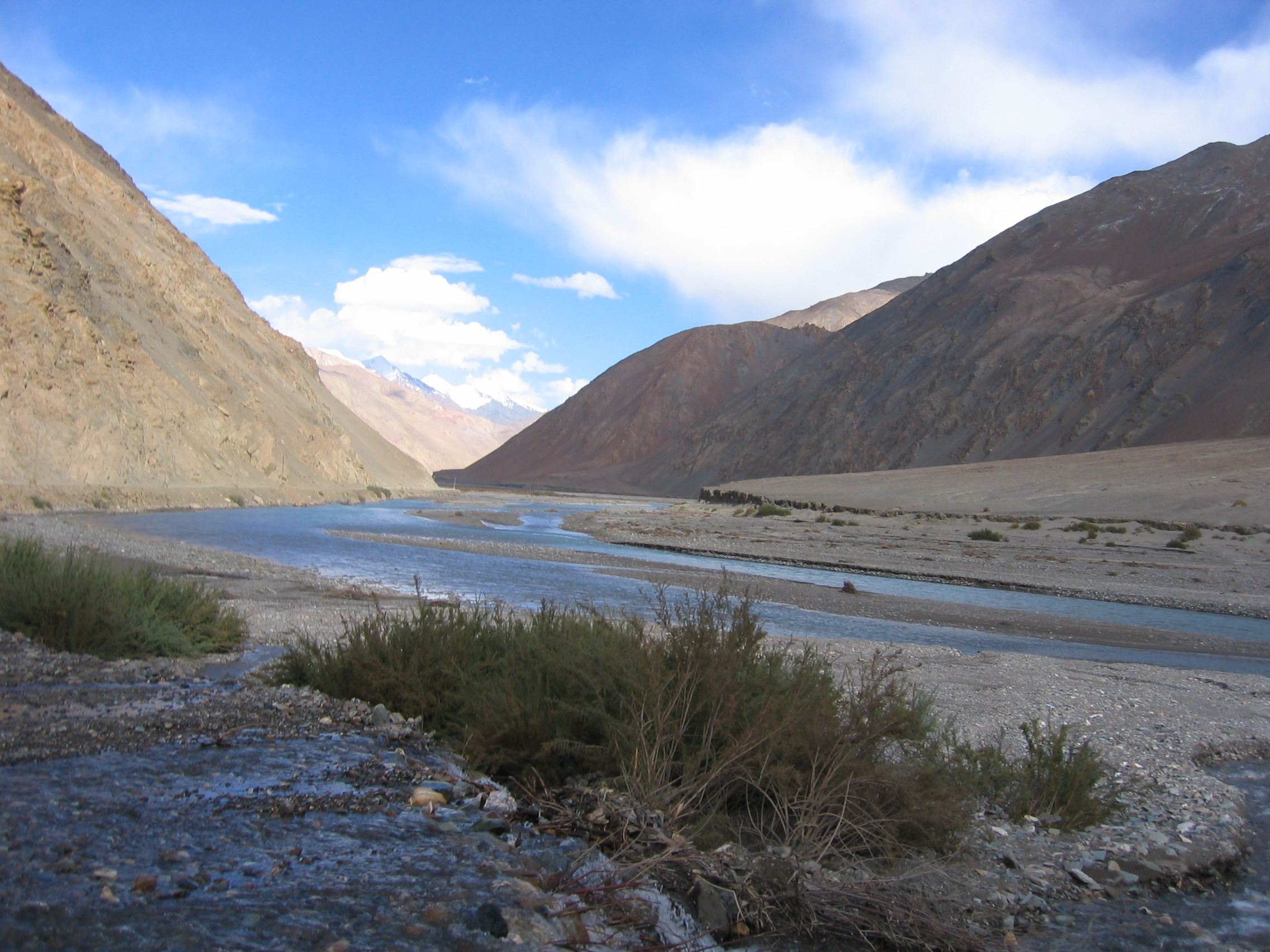
- Yarkand River

- Location within Southern Xinjiang

Location
- Country: China
- Province: Xinjiang

Physical characteristics
- Source: Teram Kangri, North Siachen Muztagh, Karakoram range at an altitude of 7,462 m (24,482 ft)
  - coordinates: 35.547983°N 77.482907°E
- 2nd source: North Rimo Glacier, East Siachen Muztagh
  - coordinates: 35.488°N 77.4479°E
- 3rd source: Karakoram Pass
  - coordinates: 35.51346°N 77.8227°E
  - elevation: 5539
- Mouth
  - location: Tarim River
  - coordinates: 38.416667°N 77.36°E
- Length: 1,332.25 km (827.82 mi)
- Basin size: 98,900 km^{2} (38,200 mi^{2})
- Discharge
  - average: 210 m^{3}/s (7,400 cu ft/s)

Basin features
- Progression: Tarim→ Taitema Lake
- Landmarks: Yarkand
- Tributaries
  - left: Shaksgam, Tashkurgan, Kashgar
  - right: Aktagh River
- Waterbodies: Altash Water Conservancy Project (Midstream Reservoir)

Yarkand River

Uyghur name
- Uyghur: يەكەن دەرياسى
Transcriptions
- Latin Yëziqi: Yeken deryasi
- Yengi Yeziⱪ: Yəkən dəryasi
- Siril Yëziqi: Йəкəн дәряси

Chinese name
- Traditional Chinese: 葉爾羌河
- Simplified Chinese: 叶尔羌河
Transcriptions
Standard Mandarin
- Hanyu Pinyin: Yè'ěrqiāng Hé
- IPA: [jêàɚtɕʰjáŋ xɤ̌]

The Yarkand River (also spelled Yarkent River) is a river in the Xinjiang Uyghur Autonomous Region of western China. It originates in the Siachen Muztagh in a part of the Karakoram range and flows into the Tarim River, with which it is sometimes identified. However, in modern times, the Yarkand River drains into the Midstream Reservoir and exhausts its supply without reaching the Tarim River. The Yarkand River is approximately 1,332.25 km (827.82 mi) in length, with an average discharge of 210 m^{3}/s (7,400 cu ft/s).

A part of the river valley is known to the Kyrgyz people as Raskam Valley, and the upper course of the river itself is called the Raskam River. Another name of the river is Zarafshan. The area was once claimed by the ruler of Hunza.

== Course ==
The river originates from the Siachen Muztagh in the Karakoram range in India–China border region, in the south of the Kashgar Prefecture. It flows roughly due north until reaching the foot of the Kunlun Mountains. Then it flows northwest where it receives waters from the Shaksgam River, which originates from the many glaciers draining the north flanks of the great Karakorum range. The Shaksgam River is also known in its lower course (before flowing into the Yarkand) as the Kelechin River (Chinese: 克勒青河; pinyin: Kèlèqīng Hé).

Then Yarkand River flows north, through the Bolor-Tagh mountains parallel to the Tashkurgan valley, eventually receiving the waters of the Tashkurgan River from the west. It is then impounded by the Aratax dam, which was completed in 2019 to store 2.2 km^{3} (1,800,000 acre⋅ft) for flood control, irrigation and hydropower generation.

After this, the river turns northeast and enters the Tarim Basin, forming a rich oasis that waters the Yarkant county. Continuing northeast, it receives the Kashgar River from the west, eventually draining into the Shangyou Reservoir.

Even though the river originally drained into the Tarim River, development along its course in recent decades has depleted its flow. During the period 1986 to 2000, it flowed into the Tarim River only once.

The drainage area of Yarkand is 108,000 km^{2}. It irrigates areas in Taxkorgan, Yecheng, Poskam, Yarkand, Makit and Bachu counties. It also irrigates ten mission fields in the Agricultural Division.

== History ==
The ancient Silk Route into South Asia followed the Yarkand River valley. From Aksu, it went via Maral Bashi (Bachu) on the bank of the Yarkand River, to the city of Yarkand (Shache). From Yarkand, the route crossed the Bolor-Tagh mountains through the river valleys of Yarkand and Tashkurgan to reach the town of Tashkurgan. From there, it crossed the Karakoram mountains through one of the western passes (Kilik, Mintaka or Khunjerab) to reach Gilgit in northern Kashmir. Then it went on to Gandhara (the vicinity of present day Peshawar). The Indian merchants from Gandhara introduced the Kharosthi script into the Tarim Basin, and the Buddhist monks followed in their wake, spreading Buddhism. The Chinese Buddhist traveller Fa Xian is believed to have followed this route.

With the Arab conquest of Khurasan in 651 AD, the main Silk route to western Asia was interrupted, and the importance of the South Asian route increased. Gilgit as well as Baltistan find increased mention in the Chinese chronicles (under the names Great Po-lu and Little Po-lu, from the old name Bolor). China invaded Gilgit in 747 AD to secure its routes to Gandhara and prevent Tibetan influence. But the effects of the invasion appear to have been short-lived, as Turkic rule took hold in Gilgit.

It is possible that alternative trade routes developed after this time between Yarkand and Ladakh via the Karakash Valley. The region of Hunza adjoining Xinjiang, which contained the passes through the Karakoram range, began to split off from Gilgit as an independent state around 997, and internecine wars with Gilgit as well as neighbouring Nagar became frequent. The rising importance of the Ladakh route is illustrated by the raids into Ladakh conducted by Mirza Abu Bakr Dughlat who took control of Kashgaria in 1465. His successor, Sultan Said Khan launched a proper invasion of Ladakh and Kashmir in 1532, led by his general Mirza Haidar Dughlat.

== Gallery ==
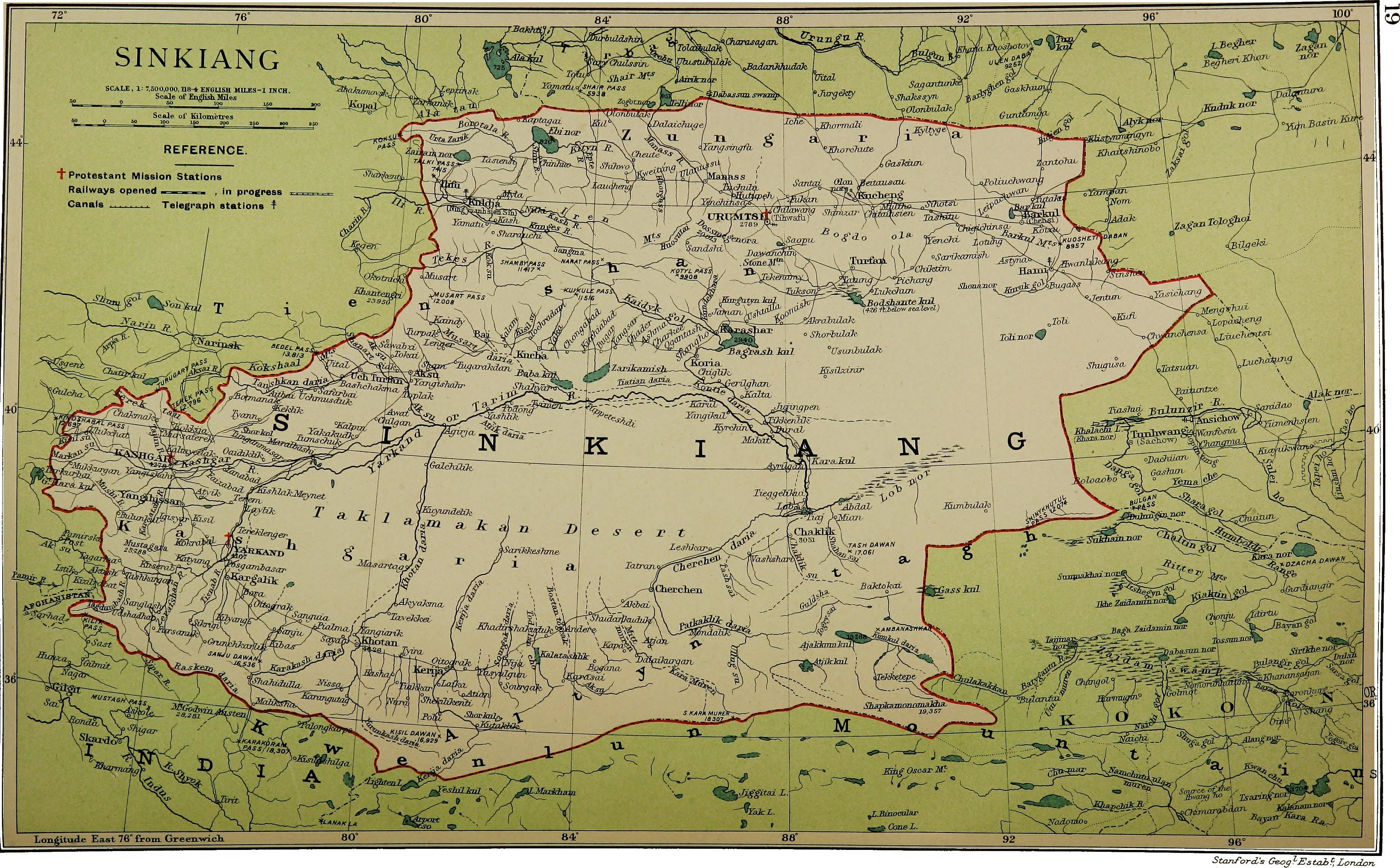
Map including Zerafshan R. and Raskem daria (1917)

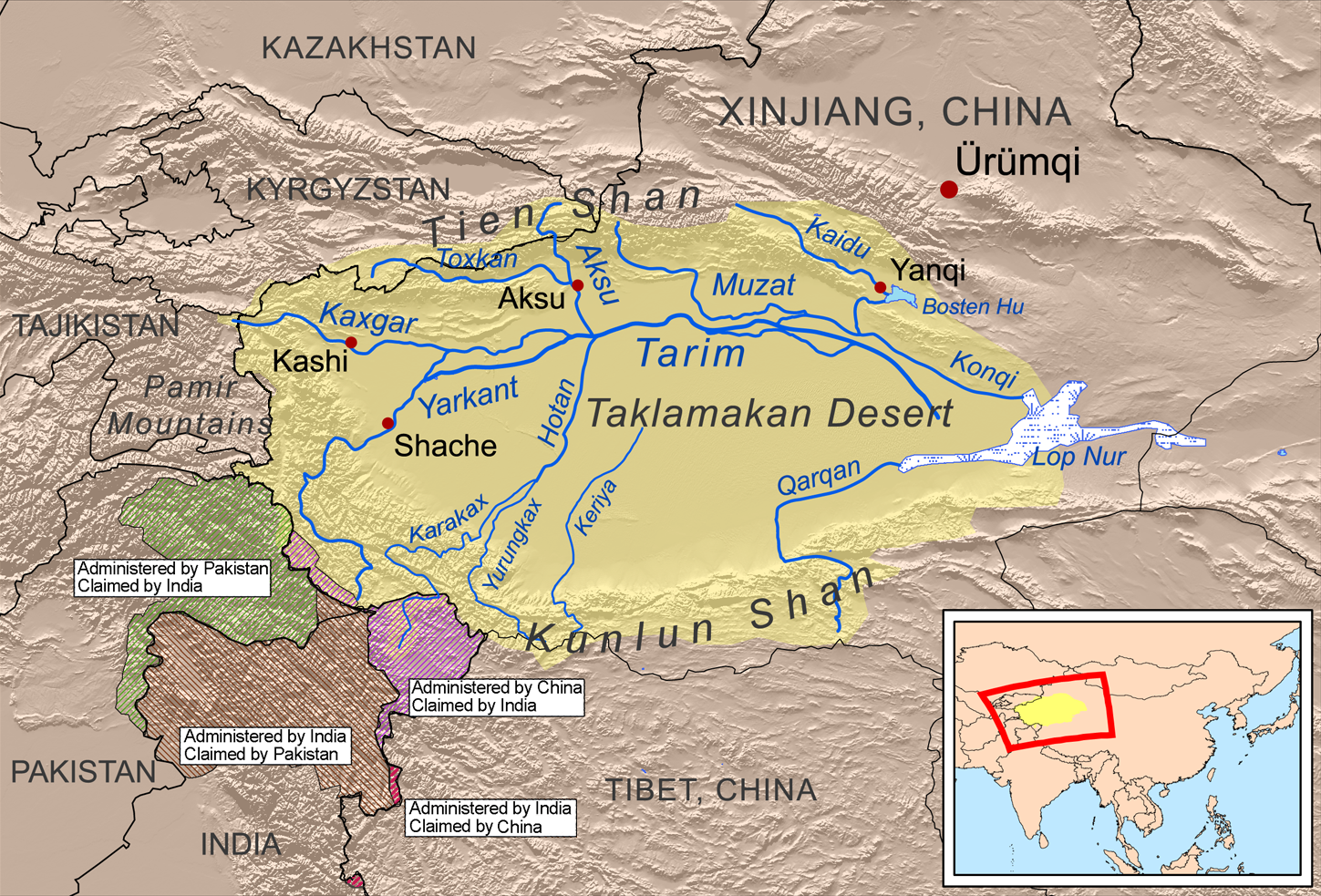
Rivers of the Tarim Basin

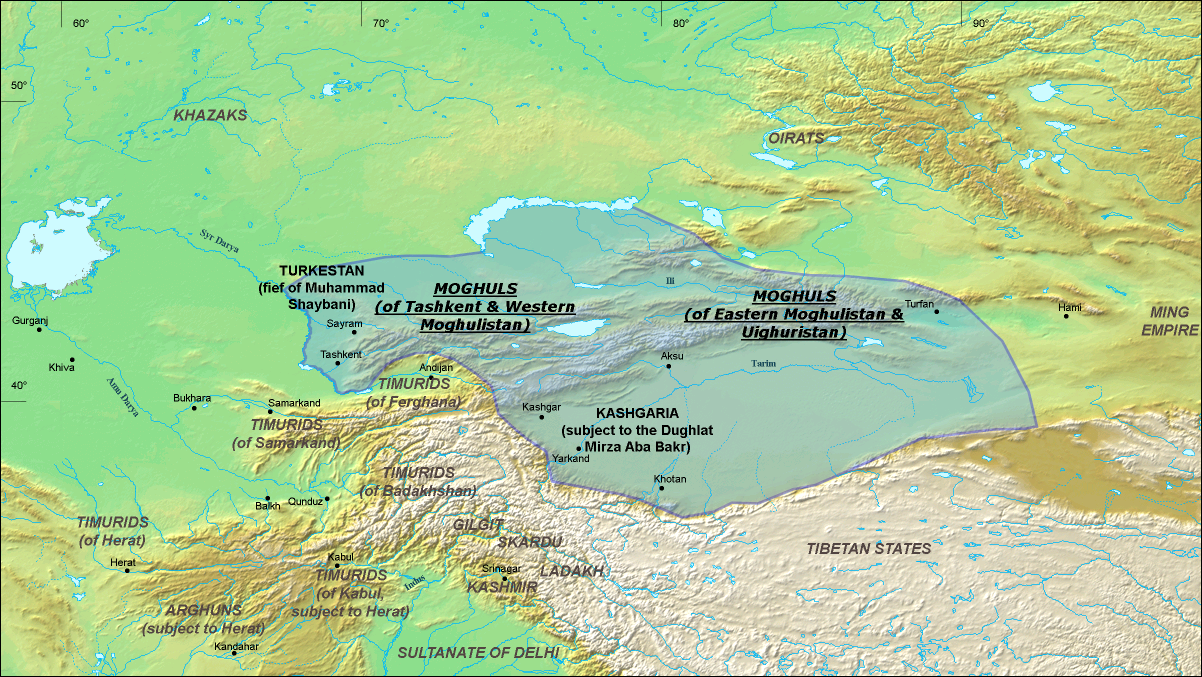
Moghulistan (Chagatai Khanate), 1490 AD

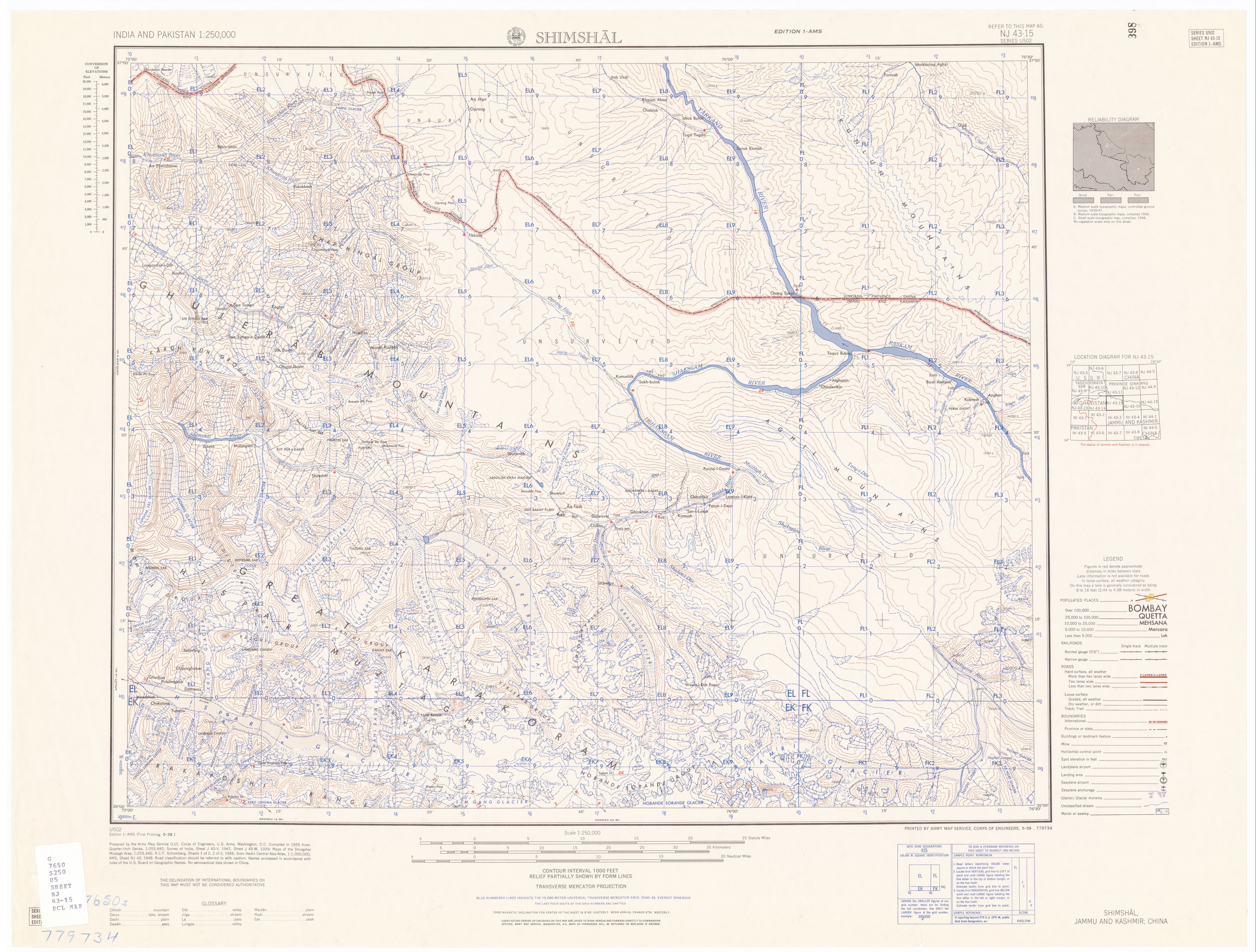
Map including part of the Yarkand River (labeled as YĀRKAND RIVER) (AMS, 1955)

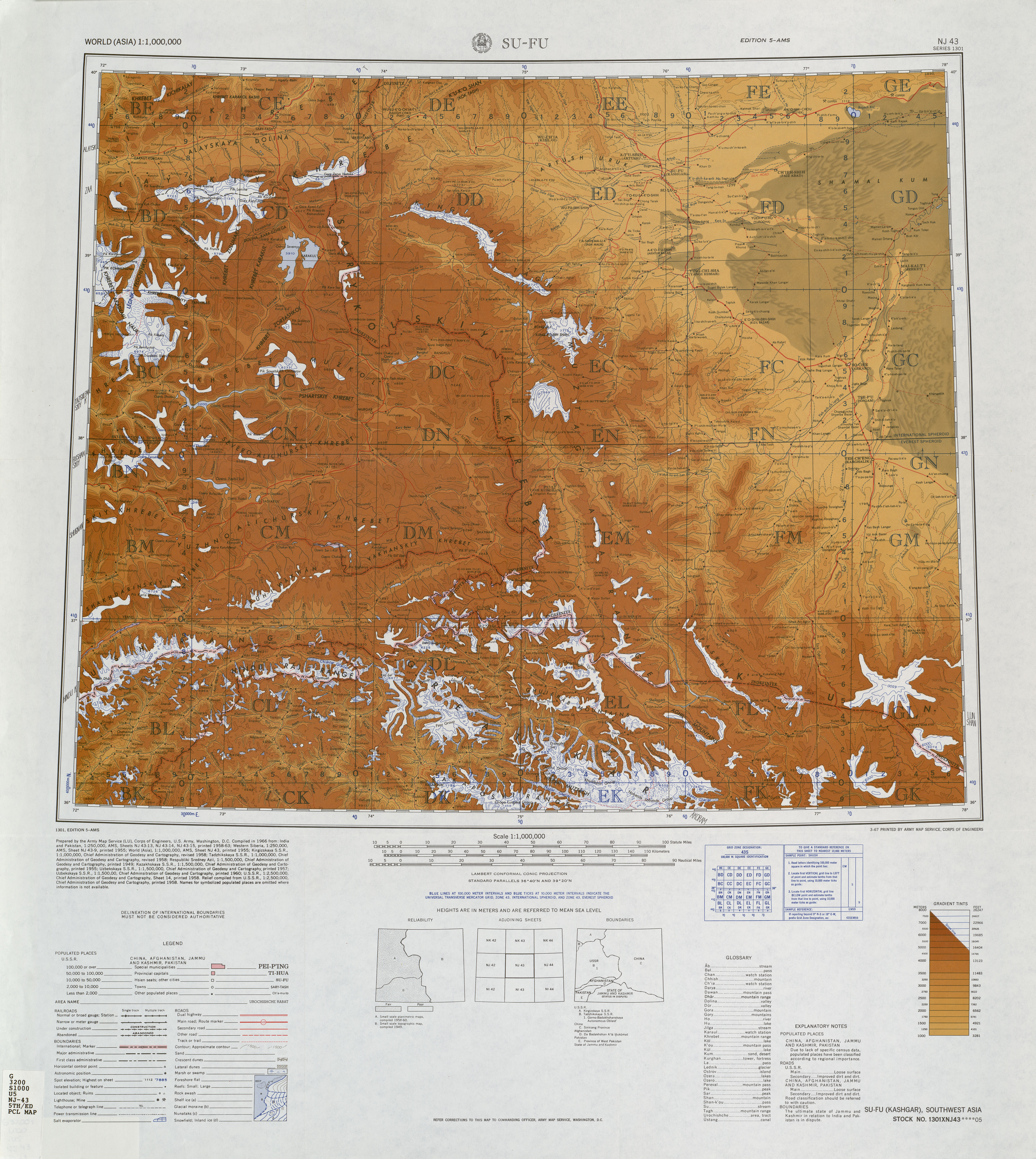
Map including the Yarkand River (labeled as Yeh-erh-ch'iang Ho) and surrounding region from the International Map of the World (AMS, 1966) (Note: From map: "DELINEATION OF INTERNATIONAL BOUNDARIES MUST NOT BE CONSIDERED AUTHORITATIVE")

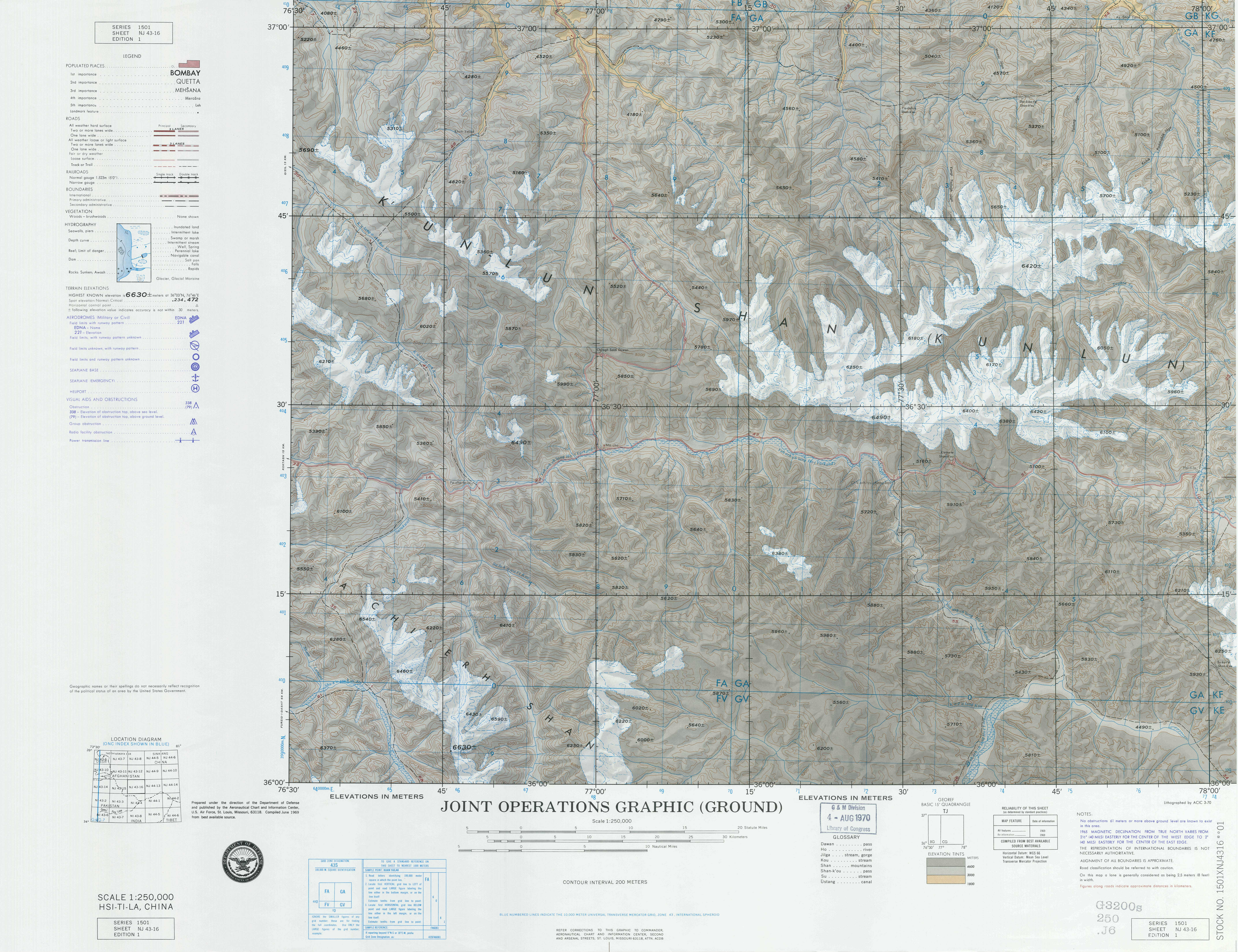
Map including part of the Yarkand River (Yeh-erh-ch'iang Ho) (ACIC, 1969)

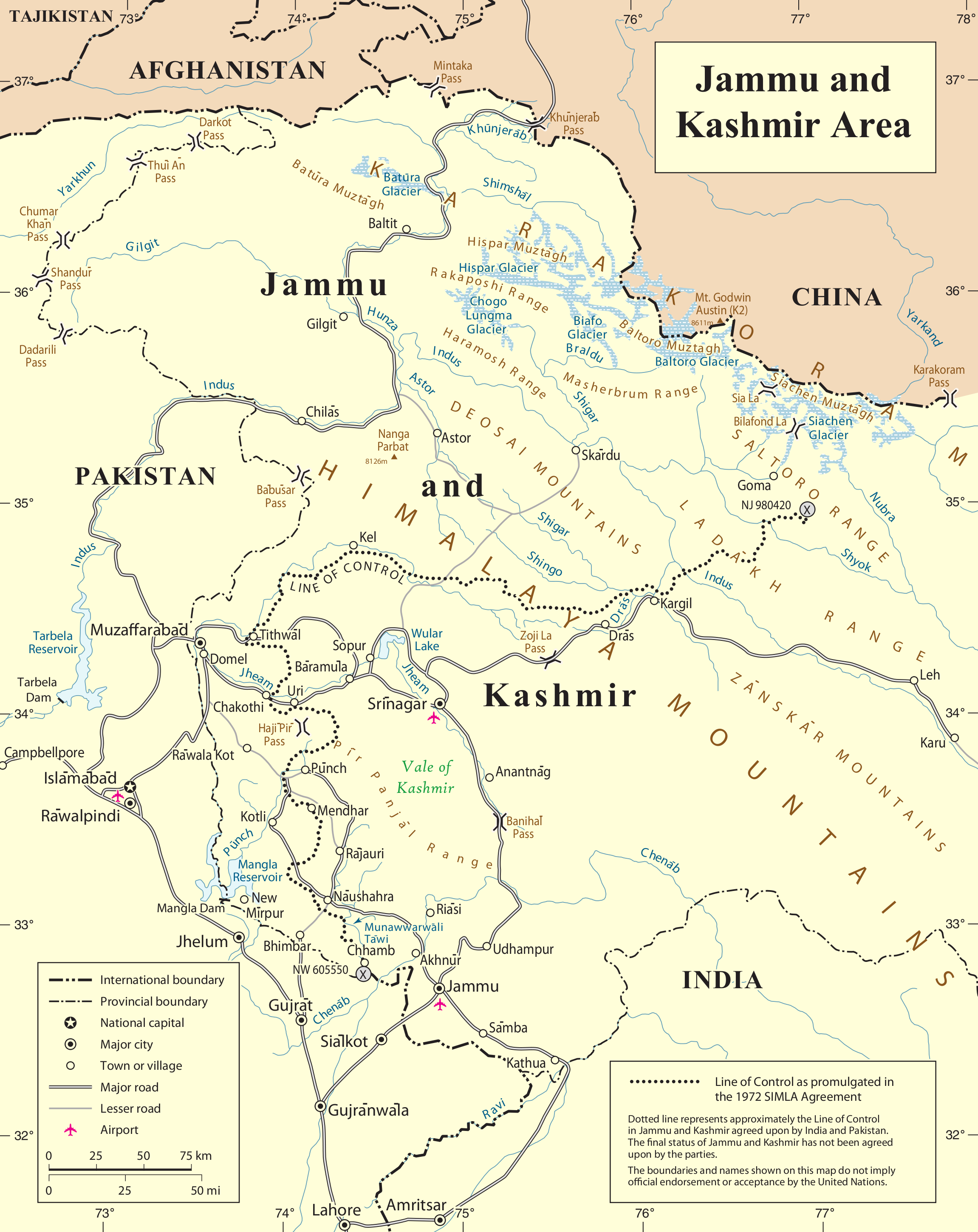
Map including the upper reaches of the Yarkand River

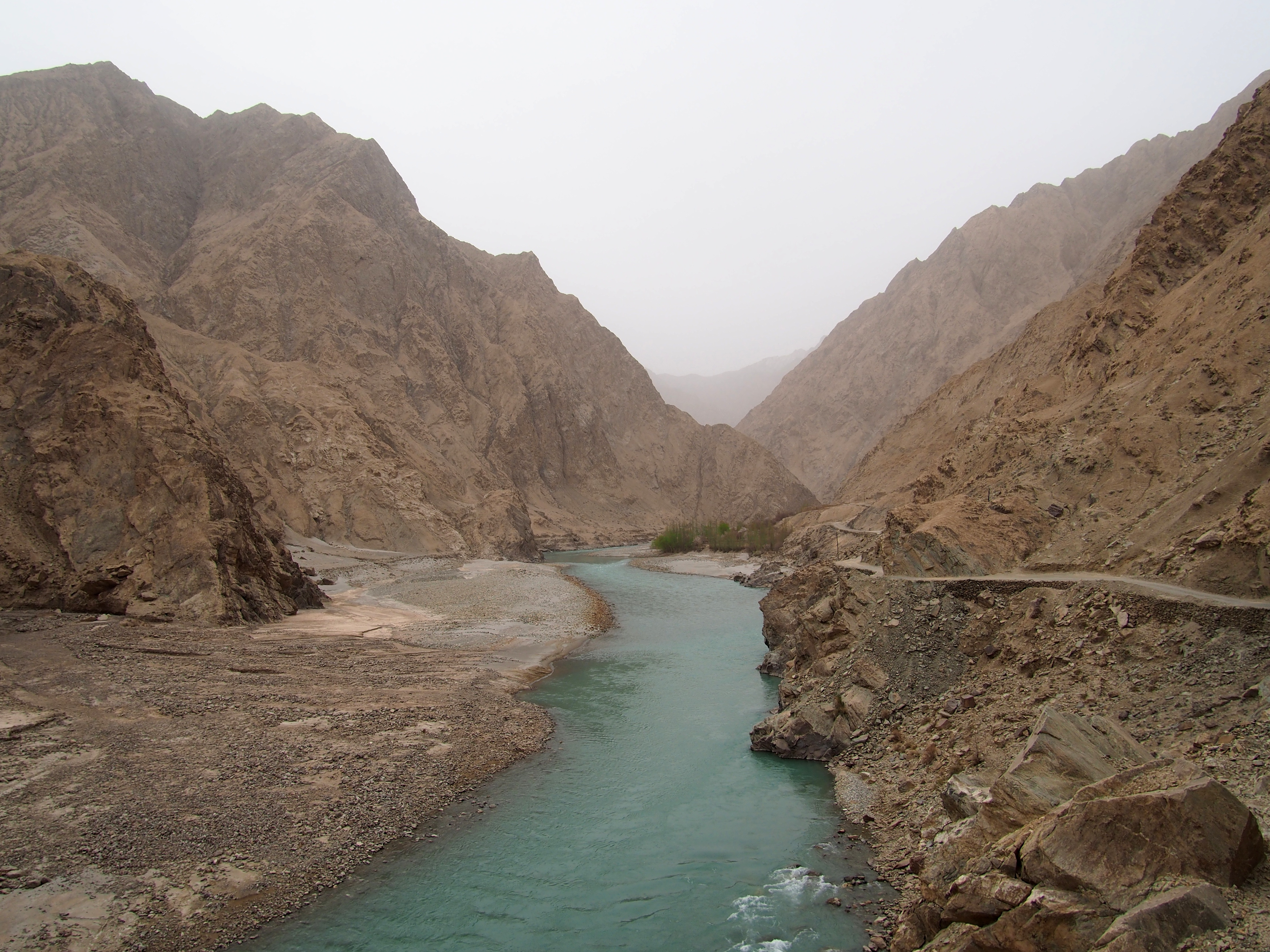
Yarkand River

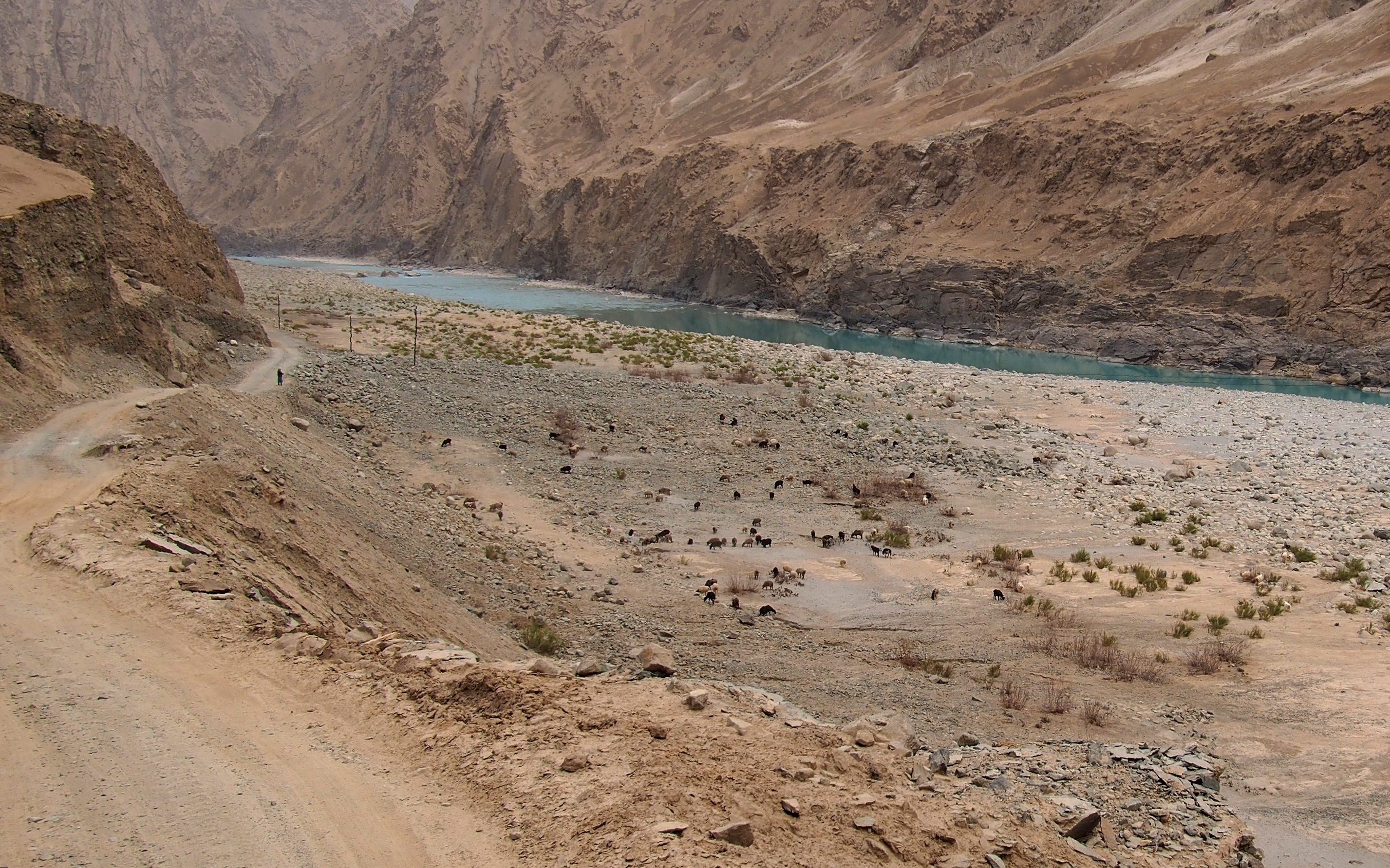
Sheep on the bank of the Yarkand River

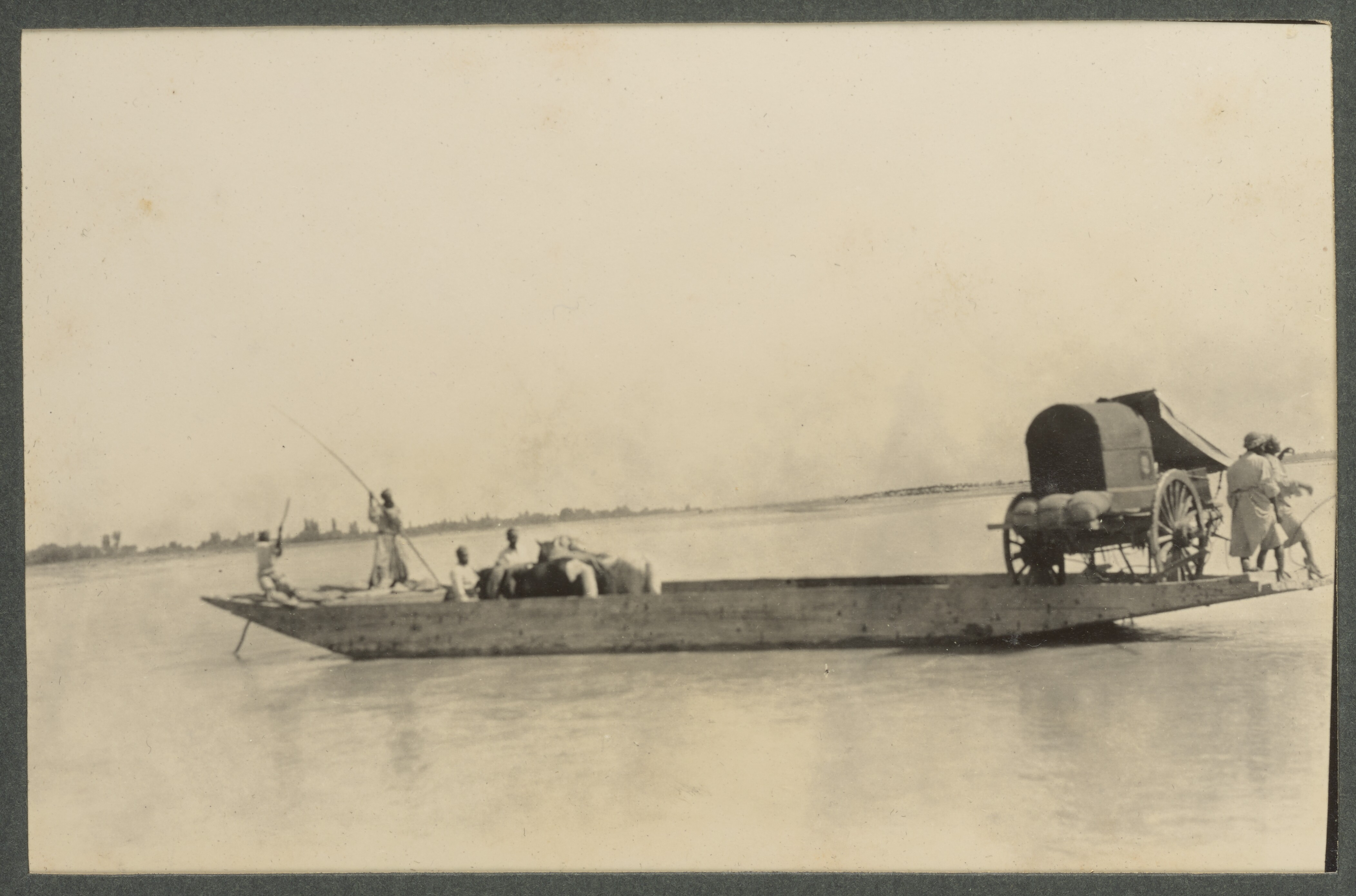
Ferry on the Yarkand River (1915)

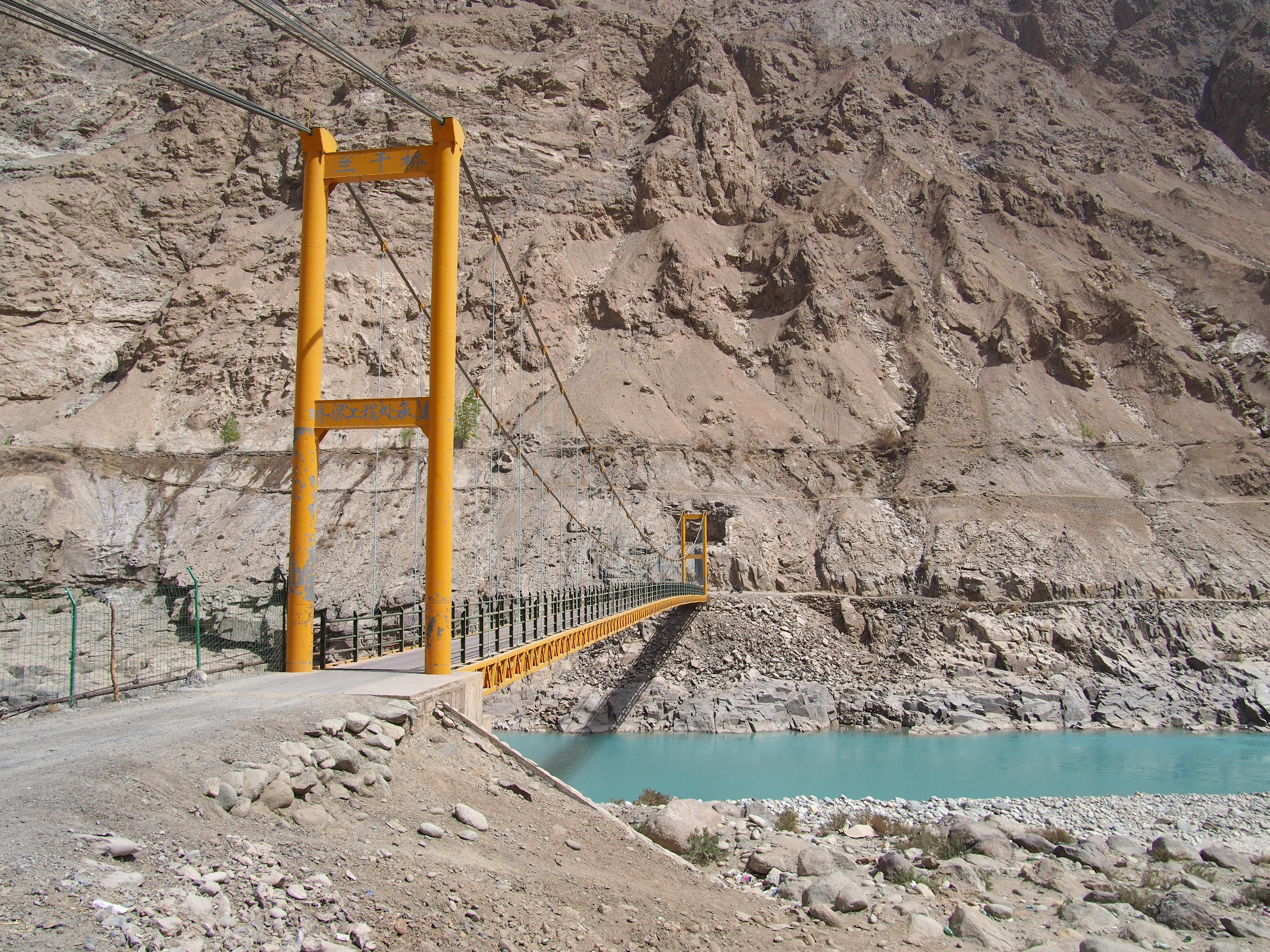
Langar Bridge (兰干桥) on the Yarkand River

== Bibliography ==
- Harmatta, János (1996), History of Civilizations of Central Asia, Volume II: The development of sedentary and nomadic civilizations: 700 B.C. to A.D. 250 (PDF), UNESCO Publishing, ISBN 978-92-3-102846-5
- Litvinsky, B. A. (1996), History of Civilizations of Central Asia, Volume III: The crossroads of civilizations: A.D. 250 to 750 (PDF), UNESCO Publishing, ISBN 978-92-3-103211-0
- Dani, Ahmad Hasan (1998), "The Western Himalayan States" (PDF), in M. S. Asimov; C. E. Bosworth (eds.), History of Civilizations of Central Asia, Vol. IV, Part 1 — The age of achievement: A.D. 750 to the end of the fifteenth century — The historical, social and economic setting, UNESCO, pp. 215–225, ISBN 978-92-3-103467-1
- Pirumshoev, H. S.; Dani, Ahmad Hasan (2003), "The Pamirs, Badakhshan and the Trans-Pamir States" (PDF), in Chahryar Adle; Irfan Habib (eds.), History of Civilizations of Central Asia, Vol. V — Development in contrast: From the sixteenth to the mid-nineteenth century, UNESCO, pp. 225–246, ISBN 978-92-3-103876-1
- Khan, Iqtidar A.; Habib, Irfan (2003), "International Relations" (PDF), in Chahryar Adle; Irfan Habib (eds.), History of Civilizations of Central Asia, Volume V: Development in contrast: From the sixteenth to the mid-nineteenth century, UNESCO Publishing, pp. 327–345, ISBN 978-92-3-103876-1
