= Poskam County, Xinjiang =

Poskam County: پوسكام ناھىيىسى (Uyghur); 泽普县 (Chinese); Posgam, Tse-p'u, Zepu
- County
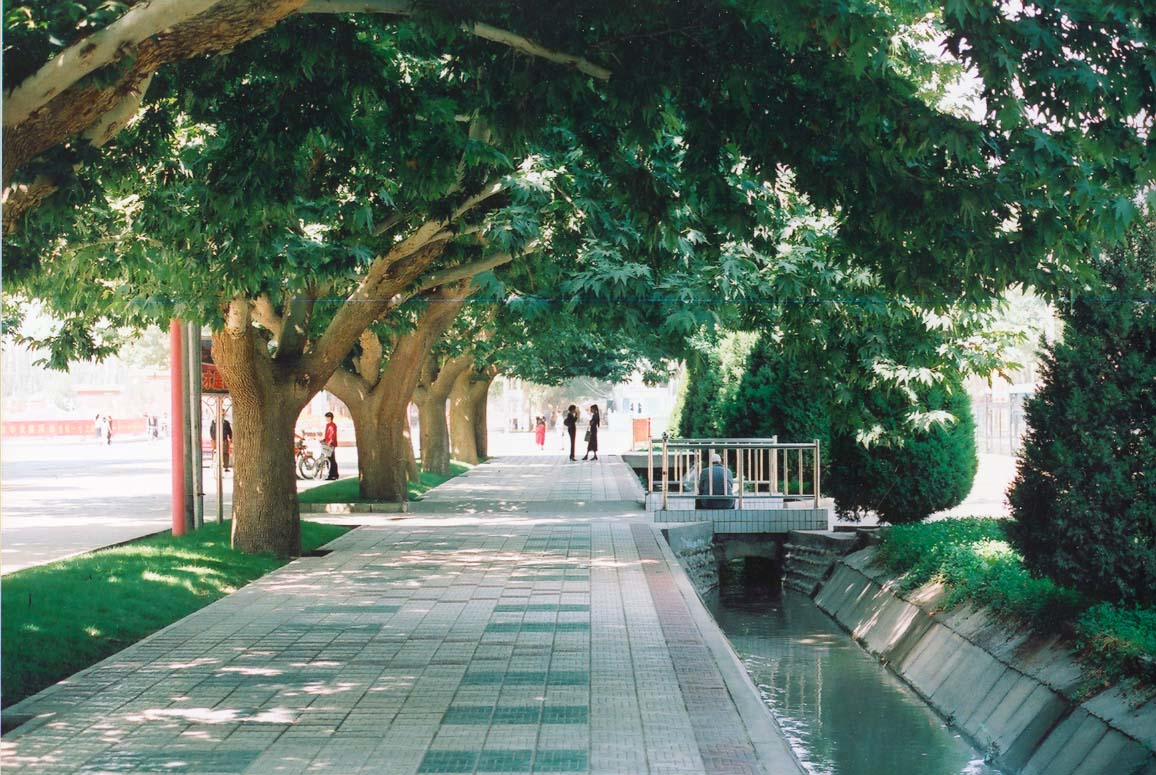

- Location of the seat in Xinjiang Poskam (Xinjiang) Poskam (China)
- Coordinates: 38°11′44″N 77°16′20″E
- Country: China
- Autonomous region: Xinjiang
- Prefecture: Kashgar
- County seat: Poskam (Zepu)

Area
  - Total: 987.97 km^{2} (381.46 sq mi)

Population (2020)
  - Total: 214,543
  - Density: 217.16/km^{2} (562.43/sq mi)

Ethnic groups
  - Major ethnic groups: Uyghur, Han Chinese, Mountain Tajik (China)
- Time zone: UTC+8 (China Standard (Note: Locals in Xinjiang frequently observe UTC+6 (Xinjiang Time), 2 hours behind Beijing.))
- Postal code: 844800
- Website: www.xjzp.gov.cn

Poskam County, Xinjiang

Uyghur name
- Uyghur: پوسكام ناھىيىسى
Transcriptions
- Latin Yëziqi: Poskam Nahiyisi
- Yengi Yeziⱪ: Poskam Naⱨiyisi
- SASM/GNC: Poskam Nahiyisi
- Siril Yëziqi: Поскам наһийиси

Chinese name
- Simplified Chinese: 泽普县
- Traditional Chinese: 澤普縣
Transcriptions
Standard Mandarin
- Hanyu Pinyin: Zépǔ Xiàn
- Wade–Giles: Tsê²-pʻu³ Hsien⁴

Poskam County (Posgam, Uyghur: پوسكام ناھىيىسى), also Zepu County (Chinese: 泽普县) is a county in Kashgar Prefecture, Xinjiang Uyghur Autonomous Region, China. The county is located on the southern bank of the Yarkand River, also known as the Zarafshān River (泽勒普善河). Poskam County is bordered to the north and west across the Yarkand River by Yarkant County (Shache) and to the south and east by Kargilik County (Yecheng).

== History ==
Zepu (Tajik: Zepruleshan) means “Golden River,” so named because gold dust was found in its sands. “Zepu” is also known as Poskam, a phonetic variation of the Uyghur Postikan, meaning “fertile land.” In 318 BCE, Zepu was a large settlement of the Kingdom of Shache in the Western Regions, located on the southern bank of the Zelepushan River.

In 65 BCE, the King of Shache killed twelve envoys and rebelled against the Han. Marquis Feng Fengshi led a coalition army from various states to suppress the revolt and installed a new king. In 60 BCE, the Han established the Protectorate of the Western Regions, and Zepu came under its administration through Shache. In 61, the Kingdom of Yutian annexed Shache, and Zepu fell under Yutian’s control. In 73 CE, the Han general Ban Chao reconquered Yutian, and Zepu returned to Han control. In 80, Shache submitted to Kucha, and Zepu followed. In 85, Ban Chao again mobilized troops from various states to attack Shache, bringing Zepu back under the authority of the central government.

From the late Han to the Northern Wei period, Shache was incorporated into Shule. In 840, the Uyghurs entered the region. In 1124, the area came under the Qara Khitai. In 1218, Genghis Khan conquered the regions north and south of the Tianshan Mountains, and Zepu became part of the Mongol Empire. In 1225, Zepu became territory of the Chagatai Khanate. In 1304 CE, the area was brought under Yuan administration. In 1514, Zepu came under the Yarkand Khanate established by Said Khan, serving as an appanage for members of the royal family.

In 1678, Zepu became subordinate to the Dzungar Khanate. In 1759, after the Qing court suppressed the Khoja rebellions, a military outpost was established in Zepu, along with the Poskam relay station. A sixth-rank kazibek official office was set up under the authority of the Yarkand amban. In 1883, Poskam was placed under the jurisdiction of Zepu County. In 1902, Shache Directly Governed Department was upgraded to a prefecture, and Zepu came under its direct administration. In 1903, Upper and Lower Poskam were reassigned to Zepu County, where an inspectorate was established to manage administrative affairs.

In 1921, Poskam County was established. After the Communist takeover, Poskam (Zepu) County was part of Yarkant Prefecture (莎車專區), which was dissolved and became part of Kashgar Prefecture in June 1956.

In 1990, 'unauthorized' mosque construction in Poskam (Zepu) County was reported in the Xinjiang Daily.

Chinese state media reported that in the early morning of October 24, 1999, two died, two were injured and major property damage was sustained at the Seyli (Saili) Township police office in a terrorist attack.

On August 27, 2018, Tong'an Township was established. (See also: Kosrap)

In 2018, Poskam County was among ten counties in Xinjiang named by the Ministry of Commerce as a model rural e-commerce county. The county was also listed as the only county in Kashgar Prefecture reaching the standard for a national-level public sanitation county.

In 2019, China National Petroleum Corp announced plans to close Taxinan refinery (塔西南勘探开发公司).

== Geography ==
The county is between 1215 and 1490 meters above sea level. The land is flat and soil is fertile. Rainfall amounts are low.

== Climate ==
Climate data for Poskam, elevation 1,275 m (4,183 ft), (1991–2020 normals, extremes 1981–present)
Month	Jan	Feb	Mar	Apr	May	Jun	Jul	Aug	Sep	Oct	Nov	Dec	Year
Record high °C (°F)	19.5 (67.1)	25.0 (77.0)	30.1 (86.2)	34.4 (93.9)	36.1 (97.0)	41.0 (105.8)	40.7 (105.3)	38.6 (101.5)	34.0 (93.2)	29.4 (84.9)	25.4 (77.7)	19.5 (67.1)	41.0 (105.8)
Mean daily maximum °C (°F)	0.7 (33.3)	6.7 (44.1)	16.0 (60.8)	23.7 (74.7)	27.7 (81.9)	31.2 (88.2)	32.4 (90.3)	30.7 (87.3)	26.9 (80.4)	20.8 (69.4)	12.0 (53.6)	2.7 (36.9)	19.3 (66.7)
Daily mean °C (°F)	−5.2 (22.6)	0.5 (32.9)	9.2 (48.6)	16.4 (61.5)	20.2 (68.4)	23.7 (74.7)	25.0 (77.0)	23.6 (74.5)	19.2 (66.6)	12.1 (53.8)	4.1 (39.4)	−3.2 (26.2)	12.1 (53.9)
Mean daily minimum °C (°F)	−10.2 (13.6)	−4.7 (23.5)	3.1 (37.6)	9.7 (49.5)	13.5 (56.3)	16.9 (62.4)	18.5 (65.3)	17.5 (63.5)	12.8 (55.0)	5.2 (41.4)	−1.7 (28.9)	−7.6 (18.3)	6.1 (42.9)
Record low °C (°F)	−23.3 (−9.9)	−23.0 (−9.4)	−7.2 (19.0)	0.0 (32.0)	4.5 (40.1)	8.7 (47.7)	10.9 (51.6)	9.7 (49.5)	4.3 (39.7)	−2.6 (27.3)	−11.5 (11.3)	−20.2 (−4.4)	−23.3 (−9.9)
Average precipitation mm (inches)	2.9 (0.11)	3.1 (0.12)	3.7 (0.15)	4.7 (0.19)	11.9 (0.47)	11.6 (0.46)	11.8 (0.46)	11.0 (0.43)	5.8 (0.23)	1.0 (0.04)	1.9 (0.07)	1.6 (0.06)	71 (2.79)
Average precipitation days (≥ 0.1 mm)	2.3	1.9	1.4	1.4	3.3	4.7	4.2	3.5	2.4	0.8	0.5	1.9	28.3
Average snowy days	5.4	3.1	0.4	0	0	0	0	0	0	0	0.6	4.5	14
Average relative humidity (%)	64	55	43	39	45	47	53	58	60	58	57	67	54
Mean monthly sunshine hours	174.6	179.2	209.3	222.6	262.2	297.6	293.5	264.7	244.2	248.9	210.2	173.9	2,780.9
Percentage possible sunshine	57	58	56	56	59	67	66	64	67	73	71	59	63
Source: China Meteorological Administration all-time February high all-time July high

== Administrative divisions ==
The county includes 2 towns, 10 townships, 1 ethnic township, and 2 township-level divisions:

Name	Simplified Chinese	Hanyu Pinyin	Uyghur (UEY)	Uyghur Latin (ULY)	Administrative division code
Towns
Poskam Town (Zepu Town)	泽普镇	Zépǔ Zhèn	پوسكام بازىرى	poskam baziri	653124100
Küybagh Town (Kuiyibage Town)	奎依巴格镇	Kuíyībāgé Zhèn	كۈيباغ بازىرى	küybagh baziri	653124101
Townships
Poskam Township (Bosikamu Township)	波斯喀木乡	Bōsīkāmù Xiāng	پوسكام يېزسى	poskam yëzsi	653124200
Zhima Township (Yima Township)	依玛乡	Yīmǎ Xiāng	ژىما يېزىسى	zhima yëzsi	653124201
Gülbagh Township (Gulebage Township)	古勒巴格乡	Gǔlèbāgé Xiāng	گۈلباغ يىزىسى	gülbagh yëzsi	653124202
Seyli Township (Saili Township)	赛力乡	Sàilì Xiāng	سەيلى يىزىسى	seyli yëzsi	653124203
Ikkisu Township (Yikensu Township)	依肯苏乡	Yīkěnsū Xiāng	ئىككىسۇ يېزىسى	Ikkisu yëzsi	653124204
Tughchi Township (Tuhuqi Township)	图呼其乡	Túhūqí Xiāng	تۇغچى يېزىسى	tughchi yëzsi	653124205
Küybagh Township (Kuiyibage Township)	奎依巴格乡	Kuíyībāgé Xiāng	كۈيباغ يېزىسى	küybagh yëzsi	653124206
Aqtam Township (Aketamu Township)	阿克塔木乡	Kuíyībāgé Xiāng	ئاقتام يېزىسى	Aqtam yëzsi	653124207
Aykol Township (Ayikule Township)	阿依库勒乡	Āyīkùlè Xiāng	ئاقتام يېزىسى	Ayköl yëzsi	653124208
Tong'an Township	桐安乡	Tóng'ān Xiāng	توڭئەن يېزىسى	tong'en yëzsi	653124210
Ethnic townships
Buyluq Tajik Ethnic Township	布依鲁克塔吉克族乡	Bùyīlǔkè Tǎjíkèzú Xiāng	بۇيلۇق تاجىك مىللىي يىزىسى	buyluq tajik milliy yëzsi	653124209
township-level divisions
Poskam Certified Seed Farm	泽普县良种场	Zépǔ Xiàn Liángzhǒngchǎng	پوسكام ناھىيە ئۇرۇمچىلىق مەيدانى	poskam nahiye Urumchiliq meydani	653124401
State-owned Tree Farm	国营林场	Guóyíng Línchǎng			653124403

== Economy ==
Irrigation is well-developed in the county, and the county is an important producer of wheat, rice, corn and cotton in southern Xinjiang. Grapes are a local speciality. Industries include mining, machinery, construction and cotton-spinning. As of 2017, Poskam County had 42,405.25 hectares of arable land. On January 14–15, 2020, Kashgar Prefecture officials carried out fourteen lectures in Poskam County on scientific methods of agriculture attended by more than 12,000 persons.

=== Tourism ===
A tourist attraction located in the county is Jinhuyang National Forest Park, rated as a AAAAA Tourist Attractions of China according to the official classification for tourist sights.

== Demographics ==
Historical population
Year	Pop.	±% p.a.
2000	181,721	—
2010	206,936	+1.31%

As of the end of 2016, 175,686 (84.1%) of the 208,950 residents of the county were Uyghur, 27,131 (13%) were Han Chinese, 4,463 (2.1%) were Mountain Tajik (China), and 1,670 (0.8%) were from other ethnic groups.

As of 2015, 181,256 of the 223,694 residents of the county were Uyghur, 35,950 were Han Chinese, 4,452 were Mountain Tajik (China) and 2,036 were from other ethnic groups.

As of the 2000 Census, ethnic minorities made up 79.38% of the population of Poskam County. As of 1999, 75.29% of the population of Poskam (Zepu) County was Uyghur and 20.76% of the population was Han Chinese.

== Transportation ==
Poskam is served by China National Highway 315 and the Kashgar-Hotan Railway.

== Historical maps ==
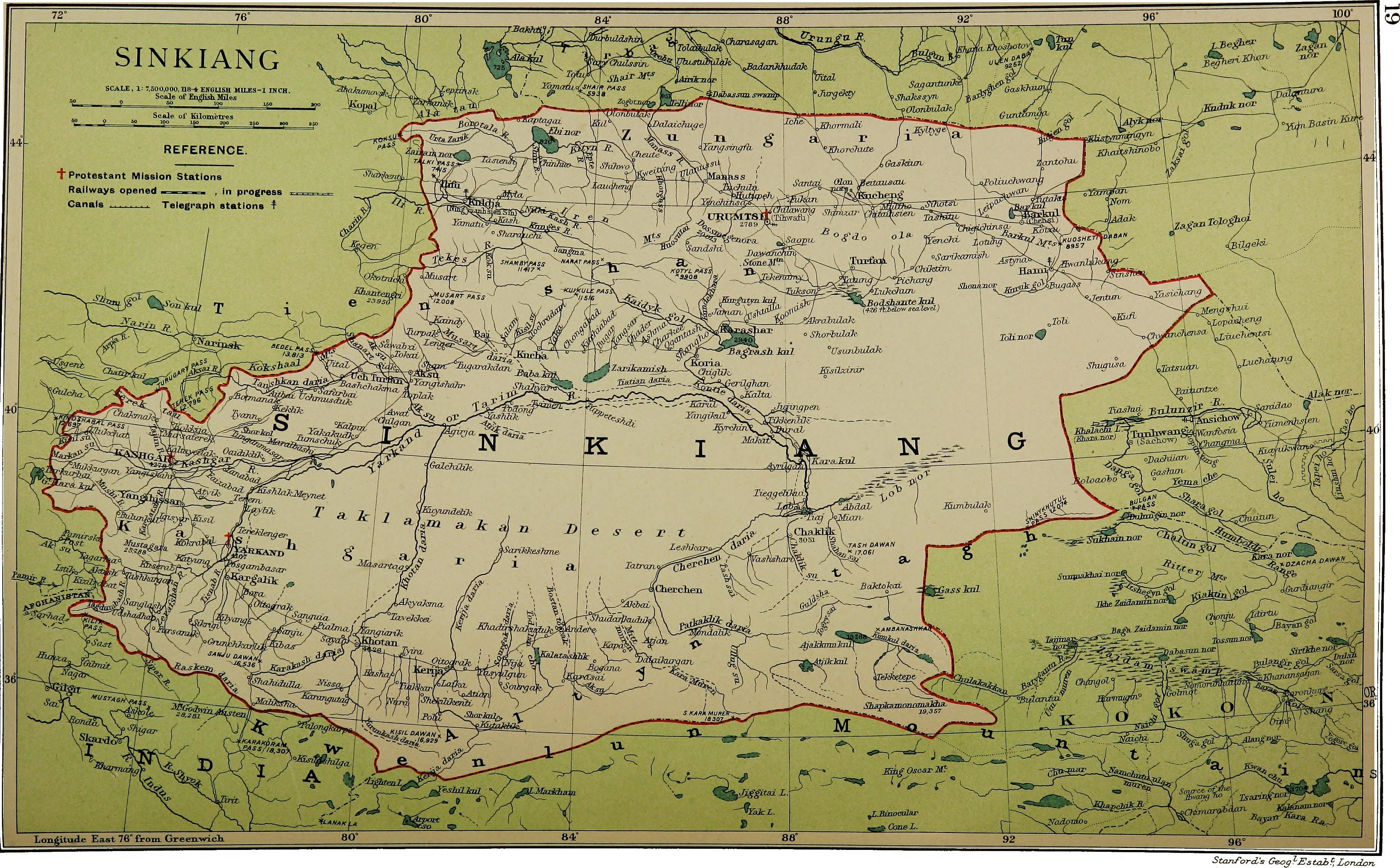
Map including Poskam (labeled as Posgambasar) (1917)

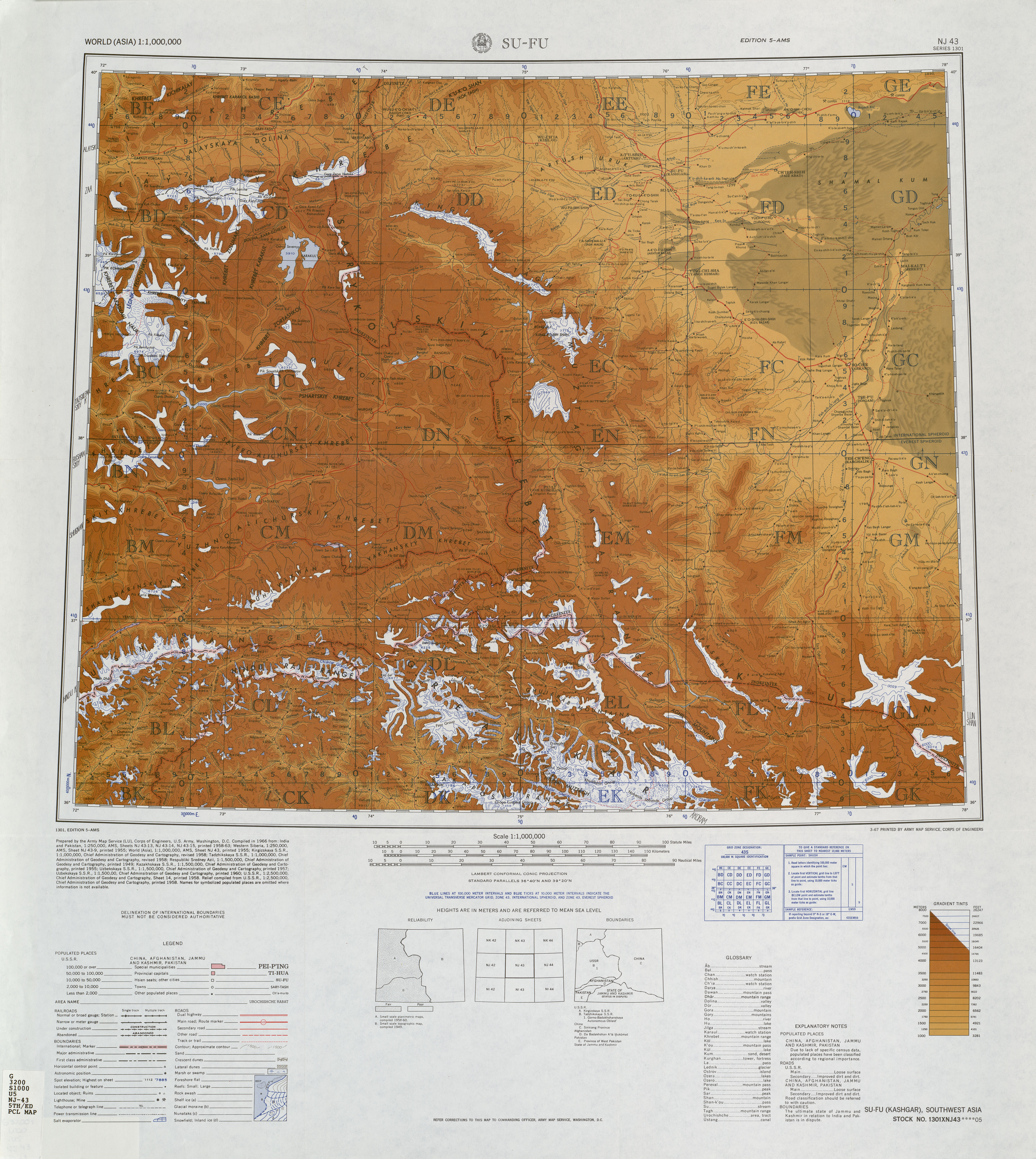
Map including Zepu (labeled as TSE-P'U (POSGAM)) and surrounding region from the International Map of the World (AMS, 1966) (Note: From map: "DELINEATION OF INTERNATIONAL BOUNDARIES MUST NOT BE CONSIDERED AUTHORITATIVE")

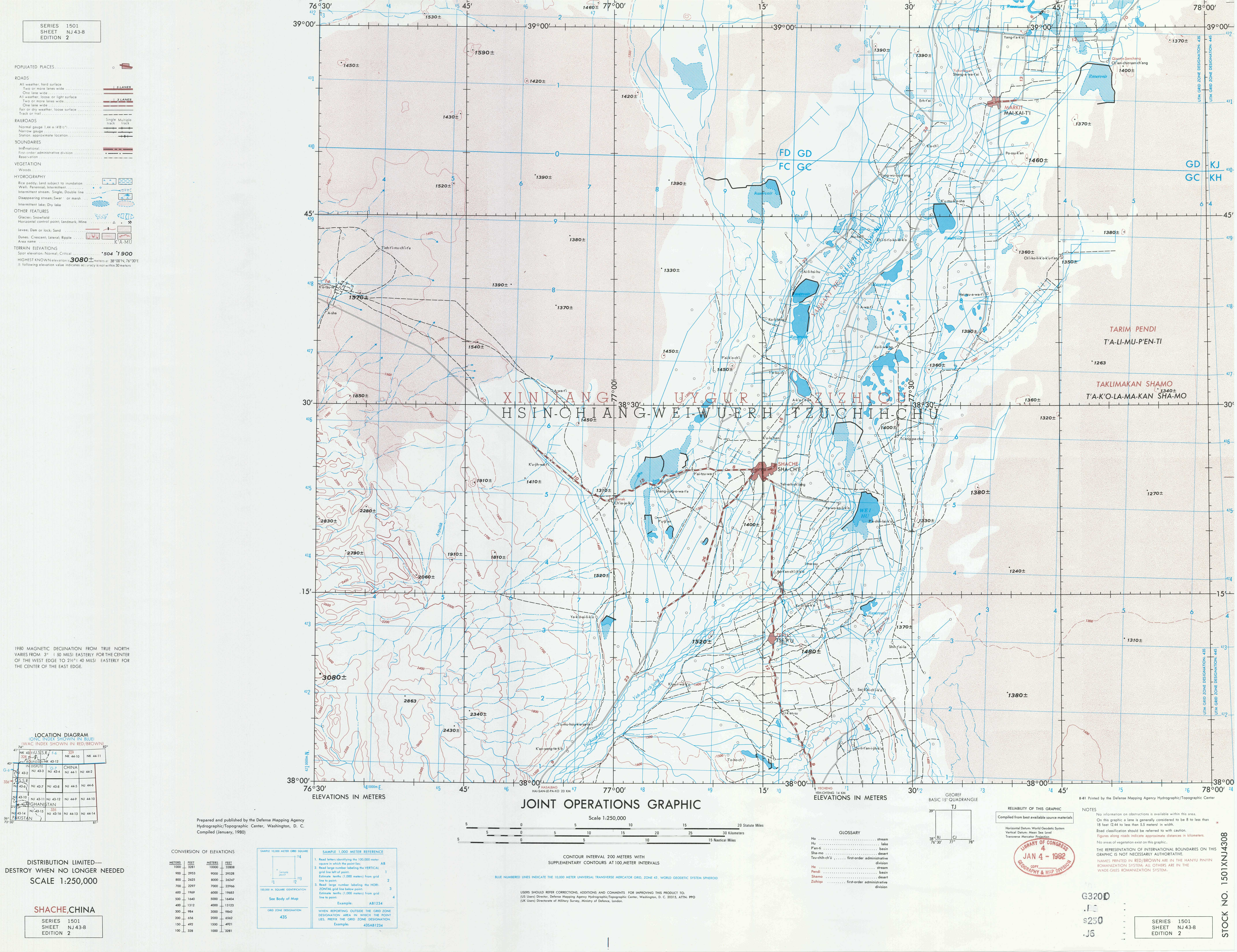
Map including Poskam (labeled as ZEPU TSE-P'U) (DMA, 1980)

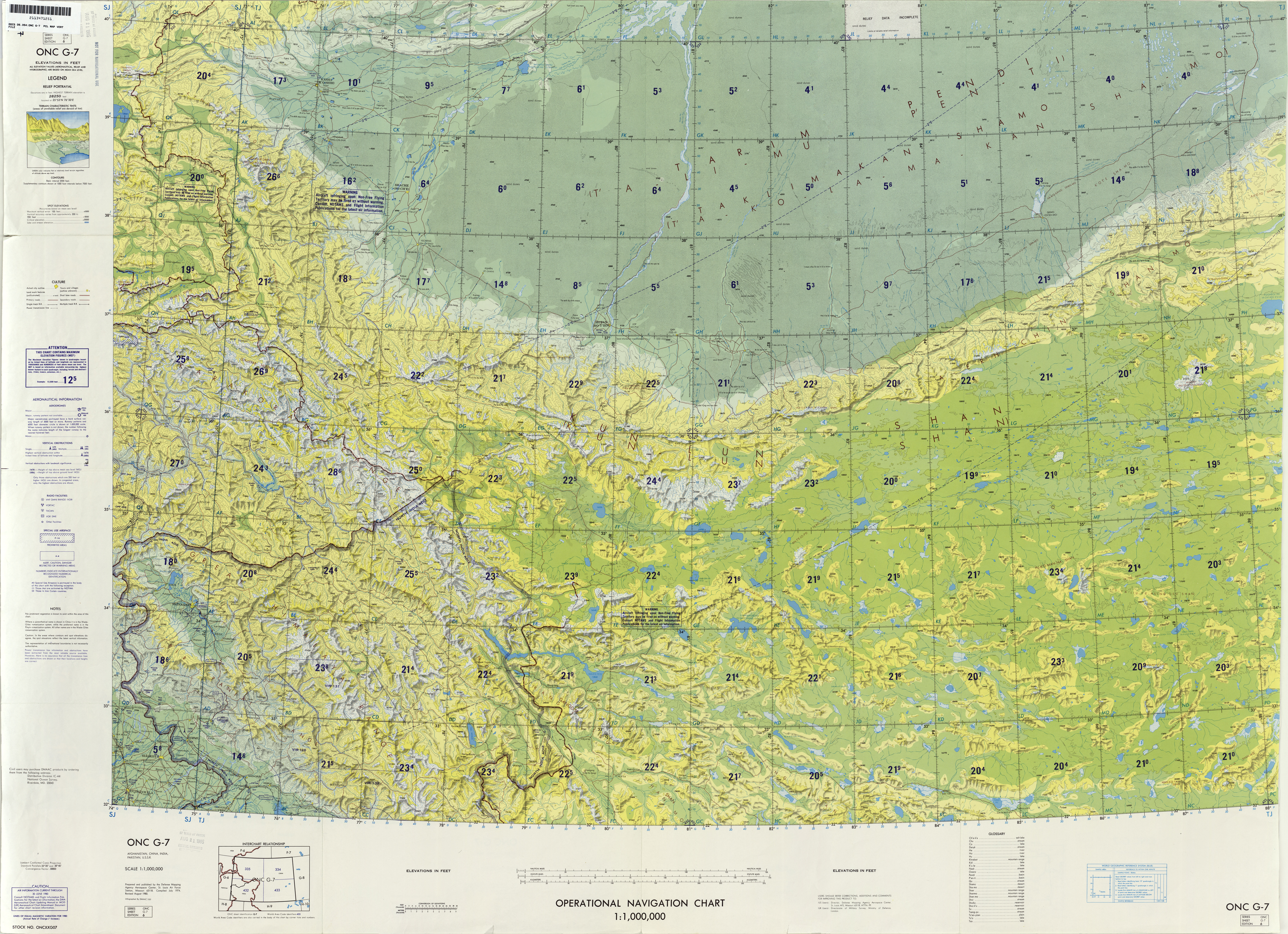
From the Operational Navigation Chart; map including Poskam (labeled as Zepu (Tse-p'u)) (DMA, 1980) (Note: From map: "The representation of international boundaries is not necessarily authoritative.")

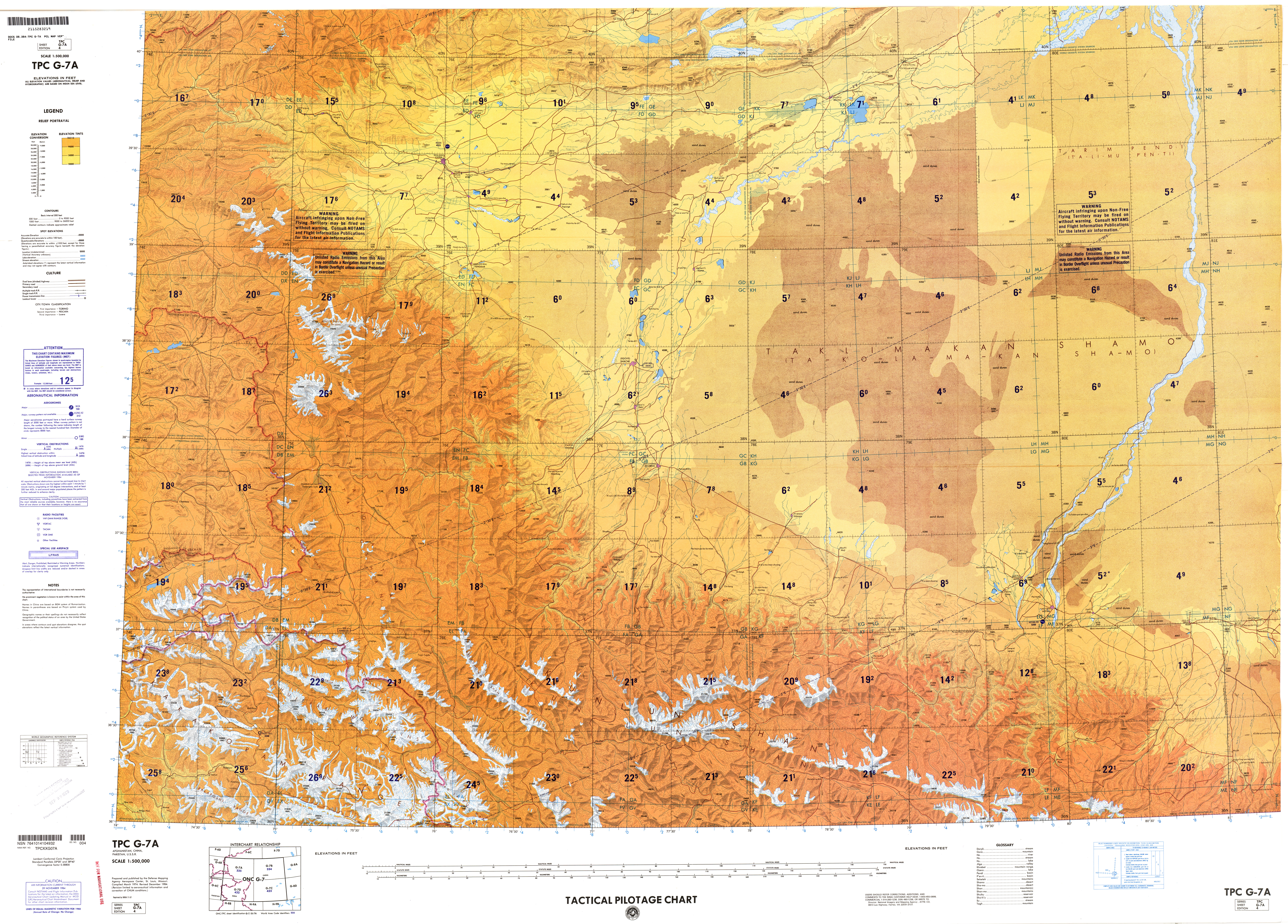
Map including Poskam (labeled as Zepu (Tse-p'u)) (DMA, 1984) (Note: From map: "The representation of international boundaries is not necessarily authoritative")
