= Qarlung =

Qarlung 恰尔隆镇 (Chinese) چارلۇڭ بازىرى (Uyghur) چارلىڭ شاارچاسى (Kyrgyz) Charlung, Qia'erlong
- Town
- Location of the town
- Coordinates: 38.0321756817°N 75.9396119541°E
- Country: People's Republic of China
- Autonomous region: Xinjiang
- Prefecture: Kizilsu
- County: Akto
- Seat: Jilande Village (جىلاندى كەنت; Jilangde, 吉郎德村).
- Villages: 5

Area
  - Total: 3,242 km^{2} (1,252 sq mi)

Population (2015)
  - Total: 5,258

Ethnic groups
  - Major ethnic groups: Kyrgyz
- Time zone: UTC+8 (China Standard Time)
- Postal code: 844100
- Area code: 653022 203
- Website: www.xjakt.gov.cn

Qarlung, Charlung (چارلۇڭ يېزىسى; Qia'erlong, Chinese: 恰尔隆乡; pinyin: Qià'ěrlóng Xiāng) is a town of Akto County in Xinjiang Uygur Autonomous Region, China. Located in the southeast of the county, the town covers an area of 3,242 square kilometers with a population of 5,258 (as of 2015). It has 5 administrative villages under its jurisdiction.

== Name ==
The name of Qarlung is from a Turkic language, meaning "the place where the mountains gather" (群山汇集处). It is named after the confluence of the four narrow valleys.

== History ==
In 1965, Qarlung Commune (恰尔隆公社) was established.

In 1967, Qarlung Commune was renamed Wuxing Commune (literally 'Five Star' Commune, 五星公社).

In 1981, Kosrap Commune was created from part of the commune.

In 1984, the commune became Qarlung Township.

On August 27, 2018, Kosrap was merged into Qarlung.

In 2020, on December 30th, the status of Qarlung Township was upgraded to the status of a town.

== Geography and resources ==
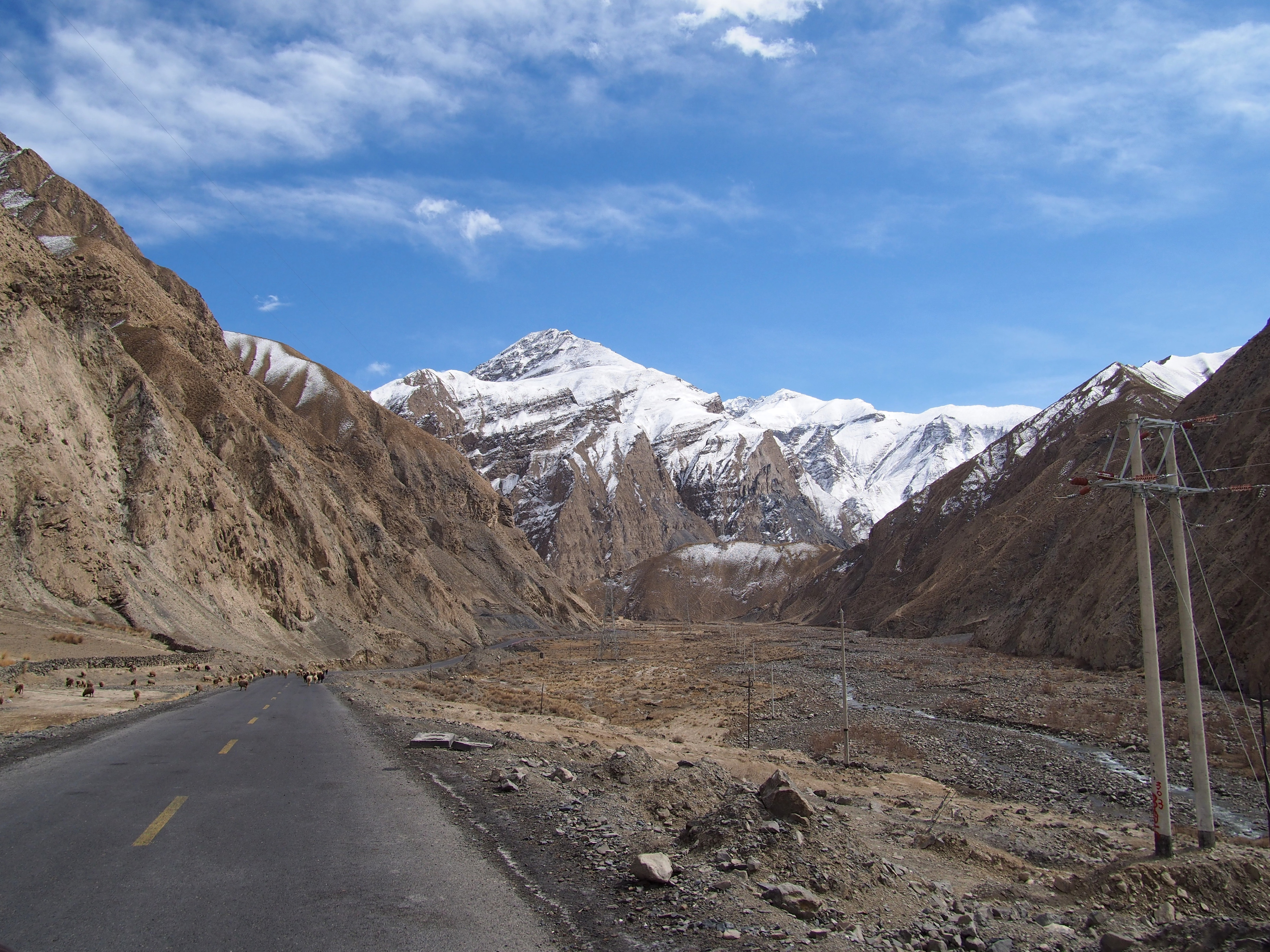
the road between Kizilto and Qarlung

Qarlung town is located between 75°09′- 76°02′ east longitude and 37°52′- 38°12′ north latitude, to the south of the county seat Akto Town. It is bordered by Kizilto and Tar town to the east and south, by Taxkorgan County to the west. Its maximum distance is 58 kilometers from west to east and 45 kilometers from north to south. It has a total area of 3,242 square meters with arable land area of 75.04 hectares and artificial grassland area of 77.89 hectares. The seat of the town is 210 kilometers away from Akto Town.

The annual average temperature is 1.9 °C, the average temperature in January is -12.1 °C, and the average temperature in July is 12.2 °C. The annual precipitation is 150–200 mm, the frost-free period is 120 days.

There are precious animals such as snowcock, yellow sheep and argali in the territory, and mineral resources such as coal, crystal, gold, iron, lead and zinc. There are two water systems of Qarlung River (恰尔隆河) and the Kesrevati River (克斯热瓦提河), and the Pashrevati Yikbulak Hot Spring (帕什热瓦提依色克布拉克温泉) with a water temperature of 40-50 °C is a sulfur spring, which can help treat skin diseases.

== Administrative divisions ==
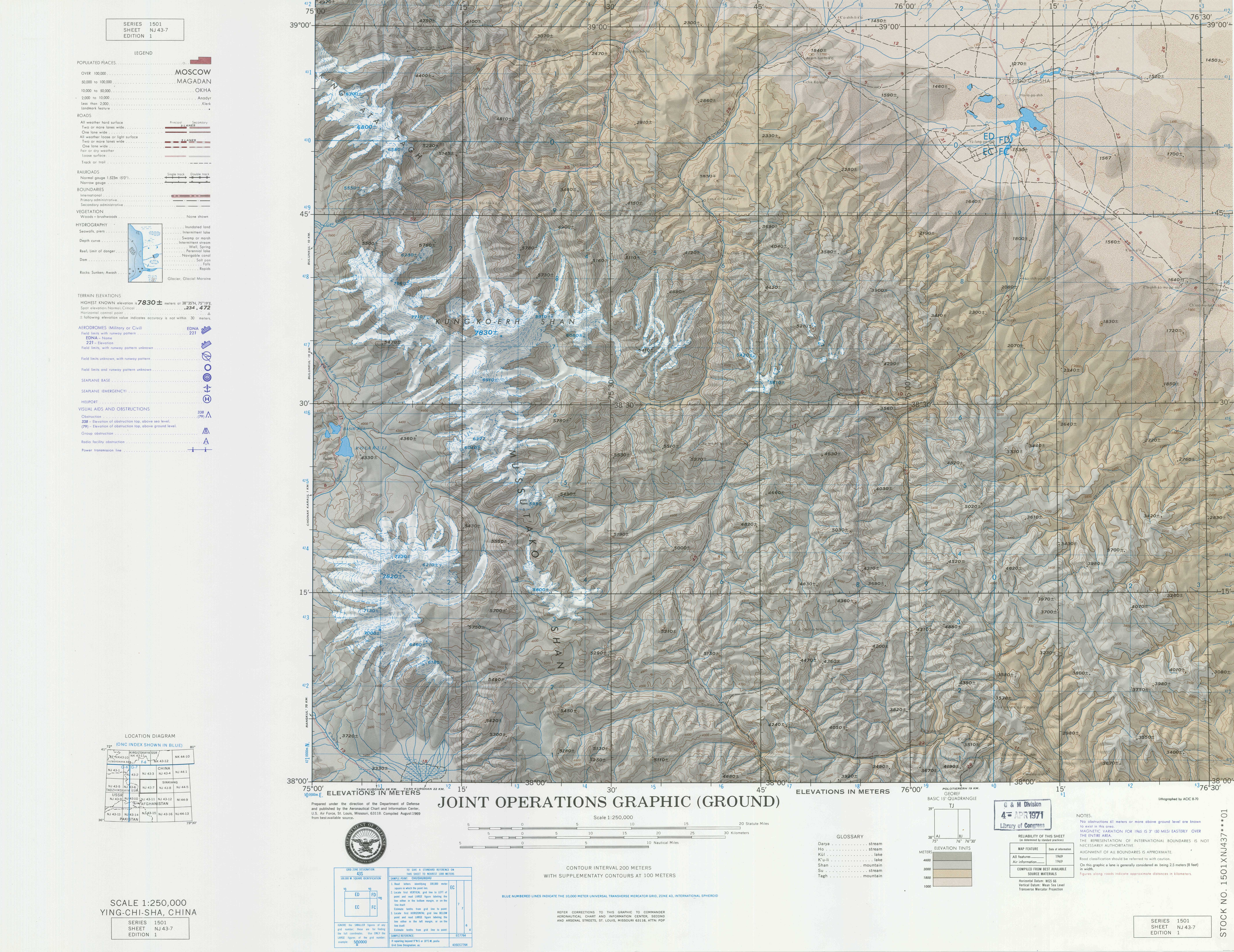
Map including Qarlung (as an unnamed populated place) (DMA, 1983)

The town has 1 residential community and 6 administration villages (including one from the dissolved Kosrap town) .

1 residential community

- Kunlun Jiayuan (Jilandi) Community (昆仑佳苑社区, كوئېنلۇن جيايۈەن (جىلاندى) مەھەللىسى,

كۉنلۉن جيايۇان (جىلاندى) قوومدۇق قونۇشۇ)

  - Prior to December 30th , 2020: Jilandi Village (Jilangdecun) (吉郎德村, جىلاندى كەنتى, جىلاندى قىشتاعى)

4 administration villages:

- Baldaling'ozu Village (Baledalingwozi; 巴勒达灵窝孜村, بالدالىڭ ئوزۇ كەنتى, بالدالىڭ ووز قىشتاعى)
  - 38°01′56″N 075°54′24″E
- Mazar'ozu Village (Mazhawozicun) (麻扎窝孜村, مازار ئوزۇ كەنتى, مازار ووز قىشتاعى)
  - 38°02′04″N 075°56′34″E
- Qayiz Village (Kayizicun) (喀依孜村, قايىز كەنتى, قايىز قىشتاعى)
- Toylabulung Village (Tuoyilubulong; 托依鲁布隆村, تويلۇ بۇلۇڭ كەنتى, تويلۇ بۇلۇڭ قىشتاعى)

1 administration village from the dissolved Kosrap town:

- Aqchigh Village (阿克其格村, ئاقچىغ كەنتى, اقچىق قىشتاعى)

1 administration villages from the dissolved Kosrap town that has been submerged under water and not been relocated:

- Zongtash Village (宗塔什村, زوڭتاش كەنتى, زوڭتاش قىشتاعى)

Unincorporated villages

- Koyjol (阔依居勒)
- Janbulak (江布拉克)

== Economy ==
As of 2020, as part of the larger poverty alleviation campaign (脱贫攻坚战), herdsman residents were given the materials to plant farms. It was reported that 162 herdsmen in Qarlung had been made responsible for about 12,000 cows and 19,000 sheep belonging to 847 households. According to Hou Zhenqi, Party chief of Akto's Qarlung township, all impoverished people in the township had been moved to a new residential compound, a policy which began implementation in 2017. The compound houses 6,593 impoverished people from 1,656 households.

== Demographics ==
Historical population
Year	Pop.	±% p.a.
2000	4,089	—
2010	4,823	+1.66%

As of 1997, the population of Qarlung was 99.9% Kyrgyz.

== See also ==
- List of township-level divisions of Xinjiang
