= Kizilto =

Kizilto 克孜勒陶镇 (Chinese) قىزىلتو بازىرى (Uyghur) قىزىلتوو شاارچاسى (Kyrgyz) Keziletao
- Town
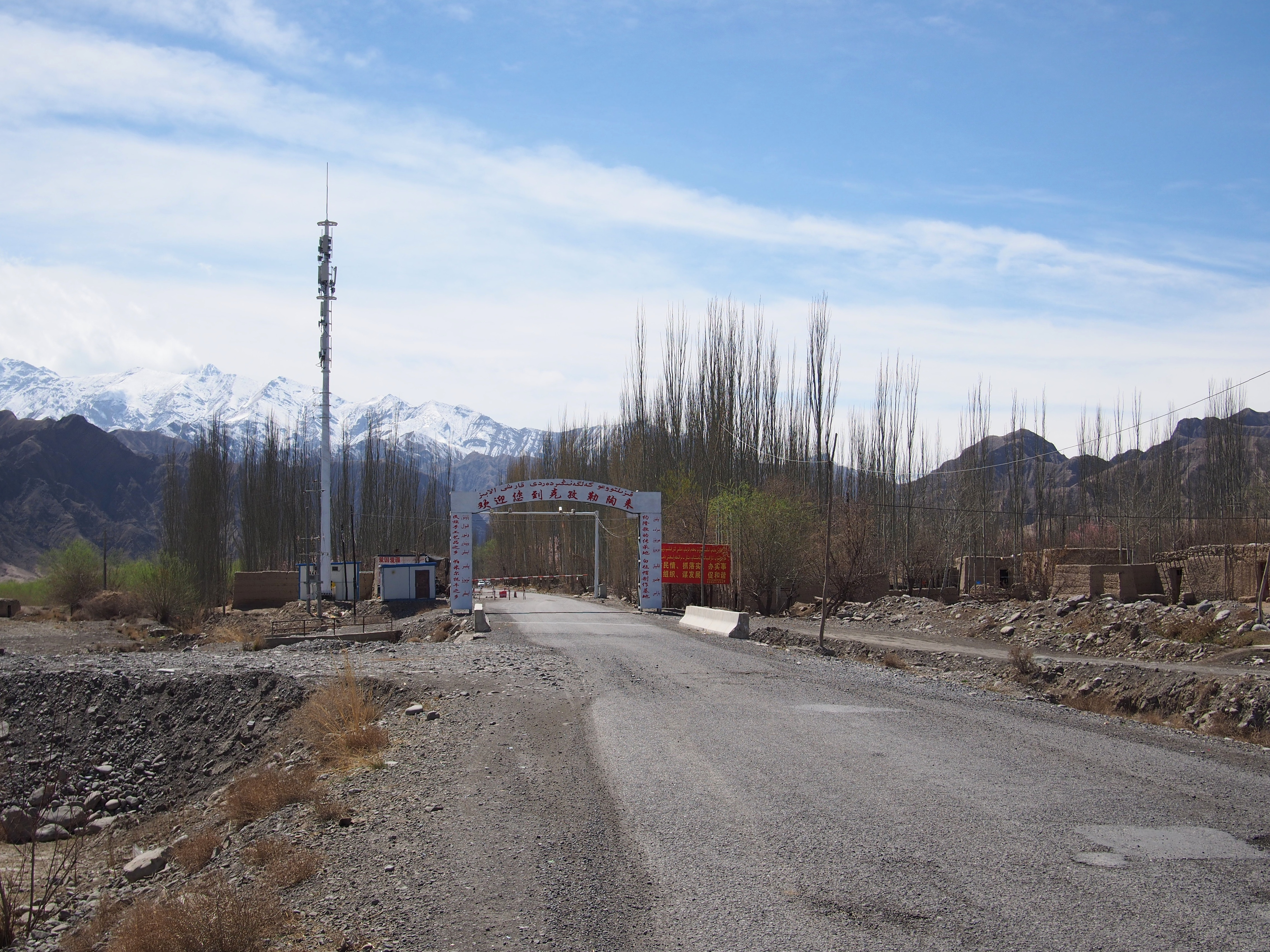
- The road entrance to Kizilto Towns

- Location of the town
- Coordinates: 38.5537367400°N 76.0725562557°E
- Country: People's Republic of China
- Autonomous region: Xinjiang
- Prefecture: Kizilsu
- County: Akto

Area
  - Total: 3,882 km^{2} (1,499 sq mi)
- Elevation: 2,200 m (7,200 ft)

Population (2015)
  - Total: 9,700

Ethnic groups
  - Major ethnic groups: Kyrgyz
- Time zone: UTC+8 (China Standard Time)
- postal code: 845558
- Area code: 653022 207
- Website: www.xjakt.gov.cn

Kizilto (قىزىلتو يېزىسى, Keziletao Chinese: 克孜勒陶乡; pinyin: Kèzīlètáo Xiāng) is a town of Akto County in Xinjiang Uygur Autonomous Region, China. Located in the southeastern part of the county, the town covers an area of 3,882 square kilometers with a population of 9,700 (as of 2015). It has 12 administrative villages under its jurisdiction. Its seat is at Ordolung'ozu Village (乌尔都隆窝孜村, ئوردولۇڭ ئوزۇ كەنتى, وردولۇڭ ووز قىشتاعى).

== Name ==
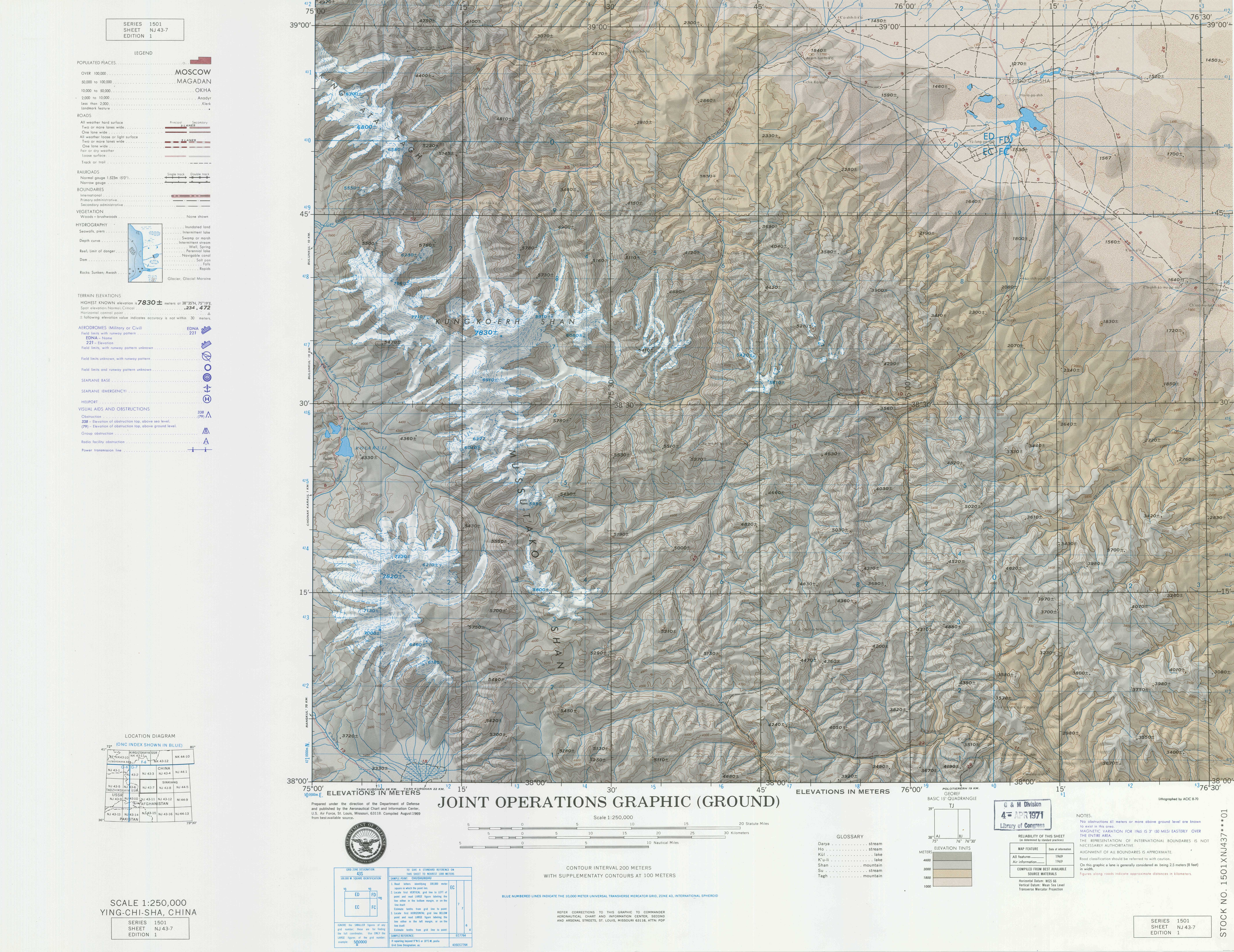
Map of the region including Kizilto (shown as an unnamed populated area) (ACIC, 1969)

The name of Kizilto is from Kyrgyz language, meaning "red mountains" (红山). This place is named after the red mountain stone on the south side of the Yigzya River (依格孜牙河). 'Kizil' ('kezile') means 'red' and 'to' ('tao') means 'mountain'. Other nearby places with the word 'kizil' (red) in their names include Kizilsu, Kizil Caves, and Kiziloy.

== History ==
In 1966, Kizilto Commune (克孜勒陶公社) was established.

In 1967 during the Cultural Revolution, Kizilto Commune was renamed Hongxing Commune ('Red star commune' 红星公社).

In 1984, the commune became Kizilto Township.

In 2020, on December 30, the status of Kizilto Township was upgraded to the status of a town.

== Geography and resources ==
Kizilto Town is located to the south of county seat Akto Town and on the eastern slope of Kunlun Mountains, and between 75°02′- 76°41′ east longitude and 38°06′- 38°56′ north latitude. The town is bordered by Kizil Township of Yengisar County (Yingjisha) to the east, by Akdala Ranch and Qarlung Township to the south, by Bulungkol Township to the west, Wuqia Township of Yengisar County to the north. Its maximum distance between east and west is 105 kilometers, and the maximum distance between north and south 75 kilometers. The seat of the town is 98 kilometers away from the county seat of Akto Town. It has a total area of 3,882 square kilometers, including 318.7 hectares of arable land, 86.8 hectares of forest land and 143,000 hectares of grassland.

The average elevation of the town is 2,200 meters. The northwest is a cold mountain climate with an annual precipitation of 150–200 mm. The southeast is a shallow mountain area, it is a temperate continental arid climate with an average annual temperature of 10.9 °C and a frost-free period of 150 days. The main water system in the territory is the Yigzya River (依格孜牙河). There are precious animals such as snow chicken, yellow sheep and argali, and there are rare plants such as wild snow lotus, codonopsis, angelica, gymnadenia conopsea, cynomorium, daphnia, comfrey and cistanche. Mineral resources include lead, zinc, iron, coal, marble and quartz.

== Administrative divisions ==
The town of Kizilto has 12 villages under its jurisdiction.

12 villages

- Arpiliq Village (A'erpalekecun) (阿尔帕勒克村, ئارپىلىق كەنتى, ارپالىق قىشتاعى)
  - 38°12′30″N 076°15′54″E
- Chimgen Village (Qimugancun; (其木干村, چىمگەن كەنتى, چئمگەن قىشتاعى)
  - 38°26′45″N 076°26′40″E
- Ghijek Village (Aijiekecun) (艾杰克村, غىجەك كەنتى, قىياك قىشتاعى)
  - 38°31′08″N 075°56′10″E
- Ordolung'ozu Village (Wu'erdulongwozicun) (乌尔都隆窝孜村, ئوردولۇڭ ئوزۇ كەنتى, وردولۇڭ ووز قىشتاعى)
- Qapqa Village (Kapukacun) (喀普喀村, قاپقا كەنتى, قاپقا قىشتاعى)
  - 38°19′26″N 076°11′27″E
- Qaratash Village (Kalatashicun) (喀拉塔什村, قاراتاش كەنتى, قاراتاش قىشتاعى)
- Qaratash Chimgen Village (Kalatashiqimugancun) (喀拉塔什其木干村, قاراتاش چىمگەن كەنتى, قاراتاش چئمگەن قىشتاعى)
  - 38°30′36″N 075°36′09″E
- Qarawul Village (Ka'erwulecun) (喀尔乌勒村, قاراۋۇل كەنتى, قاروول قىشتاعى)
  - 38°34′12″N 076°06′51″E
- Tam Village (Tamucun) (塔木村, تام كەنتى, تام قىشتاعى)
- Tamboz Village (塔木柏孜村, تامبوز كەنتى, تامبوز قىشتاعى)
- Tarkechik (Hongxin) Village (塔尔开其克村(红新村), تاركېچىك (خۇڭشىن) كەنتى, تاركەچئك (حوڭشىن) قىشتاعى)
- Toyunduq Village (Tuoyundukecun) (托云都克村, تويۇندۇق كەنتى, تويعوندۇق قىشتاعى)
  - 38°33′30″N 076°15′53″E

Unincorporated villages

- Qat (恰特)

== Demographics ==
Historical population
| Year | Pop. | ±% p.a. |
|---|---|---|
| 2000 | 7,427 | — |
| 2010 | 9,259 | +2.23% |
| 2015 | 9,700 | +0.93% |

As of 1997, the population of Kizilto was 99.16% Kyrgyz.

== Economy ==
The economy of the town is mainly animal husbandry, and there are more high-quality summer grasses on shallow hillsides and river valleys. It mainly grows food crops such as wheat, corn and highland barley.

== See also ==
- List of township-level divisions of Xinjiang
