= Bolor-Tagh =

Coordinates: 38.5945220°N 75.3151402°E

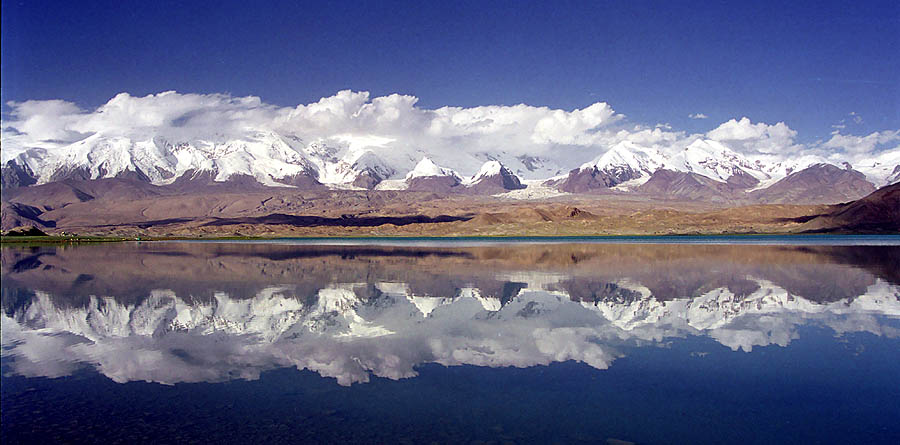
The range of Bolor-Tagh with Karakul Lake in the foreground.

Bolor-Tagh is an old name for the longitudinal range in eastern Pamir Mountains (ancient Mount Imeon) extending from Kunlun Mountains in the south to the east extremity of the Trans-Alay Range in the north. Highest peaks Kongur Tagh (7649 m) and Muztagh Ata. Bolor-Tagh lies entirely in the Xinjiang province of western China. Marco Polo visited the area in 1272 or 1273 during his travel to China, describing it under the name of ‘Belor’.
