= Altash Water Conservancy Project =

Aritash Water Conservancy Project 阿尔塔什水利枢纽工程
- Country: China
- Location: Yarkant River Basin, southern Xinjiang
- Purpose: Power, flood control
- Construction began: 2006
- Opening date: October 10, 2011
- Construction cost: ¥10.986 billion

The Aritash Water Conservancy Project (Chinese: 阿尔塔什水利枢纽工程), also called as Aritash Hydro-junction dam, is the largest water conservancy project in Xinjiang. The project is located in the upper reaches of the Yarkant River and deep in the Kunlun Mountains. It is called as "Xinjiang Three Gorges Dam" by some Chinese experts.

== History ==
In 2006, the Aritash Water Conservancy Project started the preliminary work. On October 10, 2011, it officially started construction.

On November 19, 2019, the dam of the project was lowered to store water. On May 29, 2020, the main dam of the project was completed.

== Background ==
The Yarkand River has been playing a crucial role in agriculture and development in Tashkurgan, Xinjiang. However, at the same time, the river brings floods to the town, severely damaging the crops, roads, and infrastructure. The Altash Water conservancy project is designed to control the upper reaches of the Yarkant River, therefore, solving the problems faced by local residents such as the destruction of crops and facilities. In addition, it will improve the ecological environment in the area surrounding the Yarkant River and support a more sustainable condition for economic and social development.
