= Niya County =

Niya County نىيە ناھىيىسى (Uyghur) 民丰县 (Chinese) Minfeng
- County
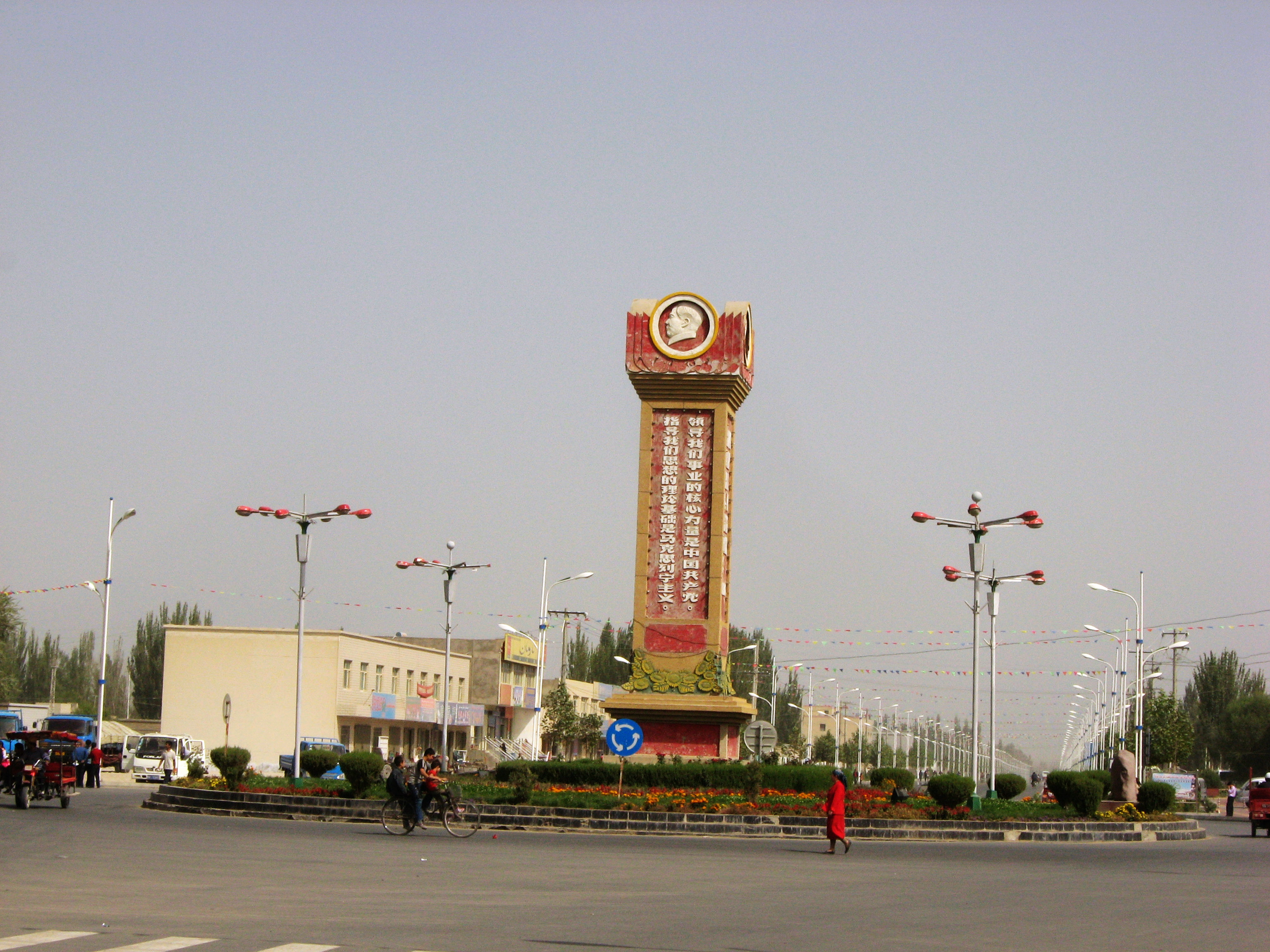
- Monument to Mao Zedong

- Location of the seat in Xinjiang Niya (Xinjiang) Niya (China)
- Coordinates: 37°04′N 82°46′E
- Country: China
- Autonomous region: Xinjiang
- Prefecture: Hotan
- County seat: Niya

Area
  - Total: 56,759.86 km^{2} (21,915.10 sq mi)

Population (2020)
  - Total: 42,649
  - Density: 0.75139/km^{2} (1.9461/sq mi)

Ethnic groups
  - Major ethnic groups: Uyghur
- Time zone: UTC+8 (China Standard (Note: Locals in Xinjiang frequently observe UTC+6 (Xinjiang Time), 2 hours behind Beijing.))
- Postal code: 848500
- Website: www.mfx.gov.cn (in Chinese)

Niya County

Uyghur name
- Uyghur: نىيە ناھىيىسى
Transcriptions
- Latin Yëziqi: Niye Nahiyisi
- Yengi Yeziⱪ: Niyə Naⱨiyisi
- SASM/GNC: Niya Nahiyisi
- Siril Yëziqi: Нийә Наһийиси

Chinese name
- Simplified Chinese: 民丰县
- Traditional Chinese: 民豐縣
Transcriptions
Standard Mandarin
- Hanyu Pinyin: Mínfēng Xiàn
- Wade–Giles: Min²-fêng¹ Hsien⁴

Alternative Chinese name
- Simplified Chinese: 尼雅县
- Traditional Chinese: 尼雅縣
Transcriptions
Standard Mandarin
- Hanyu Pinyin: Níyǎ Xiàn

Niya County (transliterated from the Uyghur نىيە ناھىيىسى Niyă Nahiyisi ; Chinese: 尼雅县), also from Mandarin Chinese as Minfeng County (Chinese: 民丰县), is a county within the Xinjiang Uyghur Autonomous Region and is under the administration of the Hotan Prefecture. It contains an area of 56,726 km^{2} (21,902 sq mi). According to the 2002 census, it has a population of 30,000. The county is bordered to the north by Xayar County, to the east by Qiemo/Qarqan County, to the west by Yutian / Keriya County and to the south by Ngari Prefecture in Tibet.

The county seat is in the town of Niya, which is often referred to by the county name (Minfeng) as well. The Niya ruins are located 115 km north of Niya.

== History ==
The earliest known political entities within the territory of the present-day county can be traced back to the ancient kingdoms of Jingjue and Ronglu during the Western Han dynasty. In 59 BCE, during the third year of the Shenjue era of the Western Han, the area was incorporated into the jurisdiction of the Protectorate of the Western Regions. During the Eastern Han dynasty, it was absorbed into the Shanshan kingdom and administered by the Chief Official of the Western Regions. During the Three Kingdoms period, the area became part of the Kingdom of Khotan.

It subsequently came under the control of the Western Jin, Former Liang, and Northern Liang regimes. In 649 CE, during the twenty-third year of the Zhenguan era of the Tang dynasty, the Pisha Dudufu (Protectorate Command) was established to govern the region. During the Northern Song dynasty, the area belonged to the Kingdom of Dabao Khotan before later coming under the rule of the Kara-Khanid Khanate.

During the Yuan dynasty, the area was initially administered by the Marshal Office of the Khotan Pacification Commission (Chinese: 斡端宣慰使元帅府) and was later incorporated into Beshbalik. During the Ming dynasty, the city of Niyang gradually declined, and residents moved upstream along the river, establishing a new settlement in the area of present-day Niya Town. The modern Uyghur name “Niya” is derived from this settlement. In 1757 in Qing dynasty, an aqsaqal administration was established in Kingdom of Khotan, and the settlement was officially named Niya Zhuang (Chinese: 尼雅庄). The area later came under the administration of Hotan County.

In the early 20th century, Aurel Stein carried out several expeditions in the area including exploration of the ancient Niya ruins. Following the establishment of the Republic of China, the area became the Eighth District of Hotan County in 1943, with two subordinate townships. In November 1943, the Eighth District was separated from Hotan County and reorganized as the Niya Administrative Bureau, directly subordinate to the Hotan Administrative Inspectorate. In April 1944, the Niya Administrative Bureau (民豐設治局) was abolished and upgraded to county status under the name Minfeng County, meaning “prosperous people and abundant resources,” while the Uyghur name “Niya” continued in local usage. The county was placed under the jurisdiction of the Seventh Administrative Inspectorate of Xinjiang Province.

After the establishment of the People's Republic of China in 1949, the county came under the administration of the Hotan Prefectural Commissioner's Office (Chinese: 和阗专员公署) in 1950. In 1953, the Andir Ranch (Chinese: 安迪尔牧场) was established. Since 1979, the county has remained under the administration of Hotan Prefecture (Chinese: 和田地区行政公署).

In 2012, the township of Yawatongguz (Yawatongguzi) was established.

== Geography ==
The northern part of the county is located in the Taklamakan Desert and consists of large areas of sand dunes. The population centers on oases around rivers flowing down from the mountains in the southern part of the county.

=== Climate ===
Minfeng has a typical Xinjiang cool arid climate (Köppen BWk), featuring hot summers, freezing winters, substantial diurnal temperature ranges and minimal precipitation year-round. As of 1997, on average, Minfeng experienced blowing dust or sand on 189 days in a year and visibility below 4.8 kilometres or 3.0 miles for more than half of winter and summer as well as for thirty to forty percent of spring. The lowest spring time temperature recorded in Minfeng was −22 °C or −7.6 °F.

Climate data for Niya, elevation 1,410 m (4,630 ft), (1991–2020 normals, extremes 1981–2010)
| Month | Jan | Feb | Mar | Apr | May | Jun | Jul | Aug | Sep | Oct | Nov | Dec | Year |
|---|---|---|---|---|---|---|---|---|---|---|---|---|---|
| Record high °C (°F) | 19.2 (66.6) | 22.3 (72.1) | 33.2 (91.8) | 36.1 (97.0) | 37.7 (99.9) | 40.8 (105.4) | 41.8 (107.2) | 41.7 (107.1) | 37.8 (100.0) | 32.3 (90.1) | 25.7 (78.3) | 21.5 (70.7) | 41.8 (107.2) |
| Mean daily maximum °C (°F) | 1.7 (35.1) | 7.8 (46.0) | 17.2 (63.0) | 24.6 (76.3) | 28.7 (83.7) | 31.8 (89.2) | 33.5 (92.3) | 32.6 (90.7) | 28.4 (83.1) | 21.6 (70.9) | 12.5 (54.5) | 3.8 (38.8) | 20.4 (68.6) |
| Daily mean °C (°F) | −5.2 (22.6) | 0.6 (33.1) | 9.3 (48.7) | 16.5 (61.7) | 20.9 (69.6) | 24.4 (75.9) | 25.9 (78.6) | 24.8 (76.6) | 19.8 (67.6) | 11.7 (53.1) | 3.8 (38.8) | −3.3 (26.1) | 12.4 (54.4) |
| Mean daily minimum °C (°F) | −11.1 (12.0) | −6.0 (21.2) | 1.6 (34.9) | 8.5 (47.3) | 13.3 (55.9) | 17.4 (63.3) | 19.1 (66.4) | 17.7 (63.9) | 12.0 (53.6) | 3.2 (37.8) | −3.2 (26.2) | −8.9 (16.0) | 5.3 (41.5) |
| Record low °C (°F) | −25.8 (−14.4) | −23.7 (−10.7) | −11.4 (11.5) | −2.7 (27.1) | 0.7 (33.3) | 6.9 (44.4) | 11.1 (52.0) | 6.2 (43.2) | 1.4 (34.5) | −6.6 (20.1) | −12.8 (9.0) | −19.8 (−3.6) | −25.8 (−14.4) |
| Average precipitation mm (inches) | 1.8 (0.07) | 1.1 (0.04) | 1.1 (0.04) | 2.9 (0.11) | 5.3 (0.21) | 14.6 (0.57) | 9.6 (0.38) | 6.0 (0.24) | 4.8 (0.19) | 0.4 (0.02) | 0.2 (0.01) | 1.0 (0.04) | 48.8 (1.92) |
| Average precipitation days (≥ 0.1 mm) | 2.3 | 1.1 | 0.6 | 0.8 | 2.0 | 4.4 | 3.8 | 2.1 | 1.3 | 0.3 | 0.3 | 1.4 | 20.4 |
| Average snowy days | 4.9 | 2.1 | 0.6 | 0.2 | 0 | 0 | 0 | 0 | 0 | 0 | 0.5 | 2.8 | 11.1 |
| Average relative humidity (%) | 52 | 42 | 28 | 26 | 31 | 37 | 41 | 42 | 43 | 43 | 43 | 53 | 40 |
| Mean monthly sunshine hours | 206.4 | 204.2 | 235.6 | 251.2 | 273.6 | 254.4 | 244.3 | 244.1 | 257.1 | 283.6 | 236.3 | 211.8 | 2,902.6 |
| Percentage possible sunshine | 67 | 66 | 63 | 63 | 62 | 58 | 55 | 59 | 70 | 83 | 79 | 71 | 66 |
Source: China Meteorological Administration

== Administrative divisions ==
The county includes one town and six townships:

| Name | Simplified Chinese | Hanyu Pinyin | Uyghur (UEY) | Uyghur Latin (ULY) | Administrative division code | Notes |
|---|---|---|---|---|---|---|
Town
| Niya Town | 尼雅镇 | Níyǎ Zhèn | نىيە بازىرى | niye baziri | 653227100 | |
Township
| Niya Township | 尼雅乡 | Níyǎ Xiāng | نىيە يېزىسى | niye yëzisi | 653227200 | |
| Rokiya Township | 若克雅乡 | Ruòkèyǎ Xiāng | رۇكىيا يېزىسى | rukiya yëzisi | 653227201 | |
| Salgozak Township | 萨勒吾则克乡 | Sàlèwúzékè Xiāng | سالغوزەك يېزىسى | salghozek yëzisi | 653227202 | |
| Yeyik Township | 叶亦克乡 | Yèyìkè Xiāng | يېيىق يېزىسى | yëyiq yëzisi | 653227203 | |
| Andir Township | 安迪尔乡 | Āndí'ěr Xiāng | ئەندىر يېزىسى | Endir yëzisi | 653227204 | |
| Yawatongguz Township (area of Yawatongguzlangar) | 亚瓦通古孜乡 | Yàwǎtōnggǔzī Xiāng | ياۋا توڭگۇز يېزىسى | yawatongguz yëzisi | 653227205 | |

== Economy ==
The economy is primarily based on agriculture and livestock farming. Products of the county include corn, wheat, cotton and sheep wool. Industries in the county include electronics, agriculture technology, food processing, carpets and construction.

== Demographics ==
As of 2015, out of the 38,492 residents, 34,900 of the county were Uyghur, 3,509 were Han Chinese and 83 were from other ethnic groups.

As of 1999, 90.94% of the population of Niya (Minfeng) County was Uyghur and 8.91% of the population was Han Chinese. By the end of 2020, the results of China's Seventh National Population Census showed that the county had a permanent resident population of 42,649.

== Transportation ==
- China National Highway 315
- Tarim Desert Highway
- Minfeng railway station serving Hotan–Ruoqiang railway

== Gallery ==
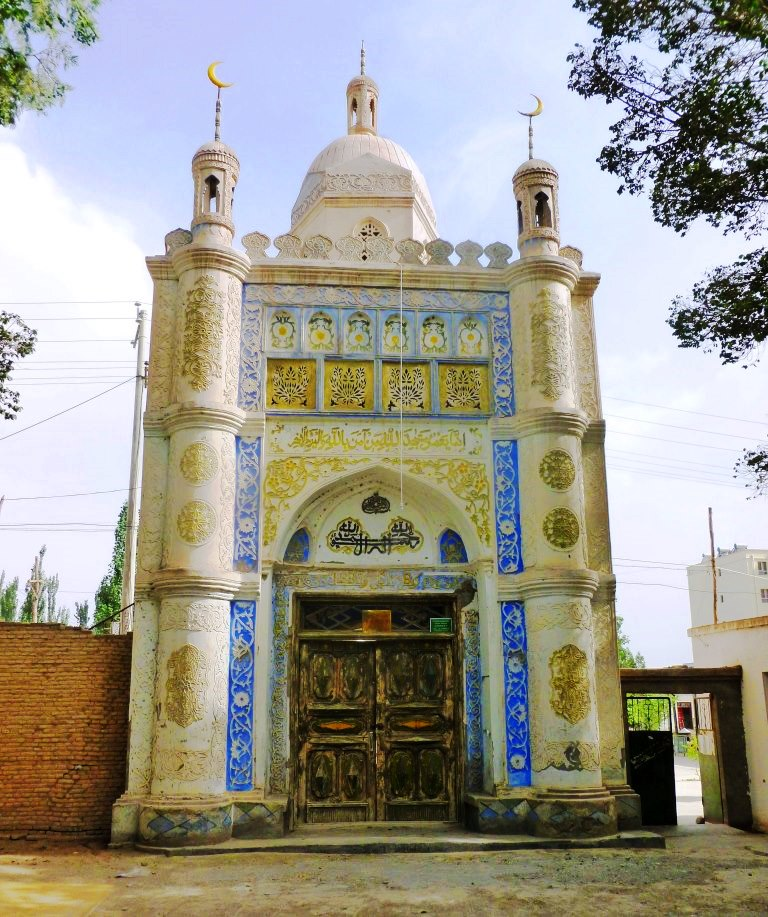
New Mosque - Minfeng.

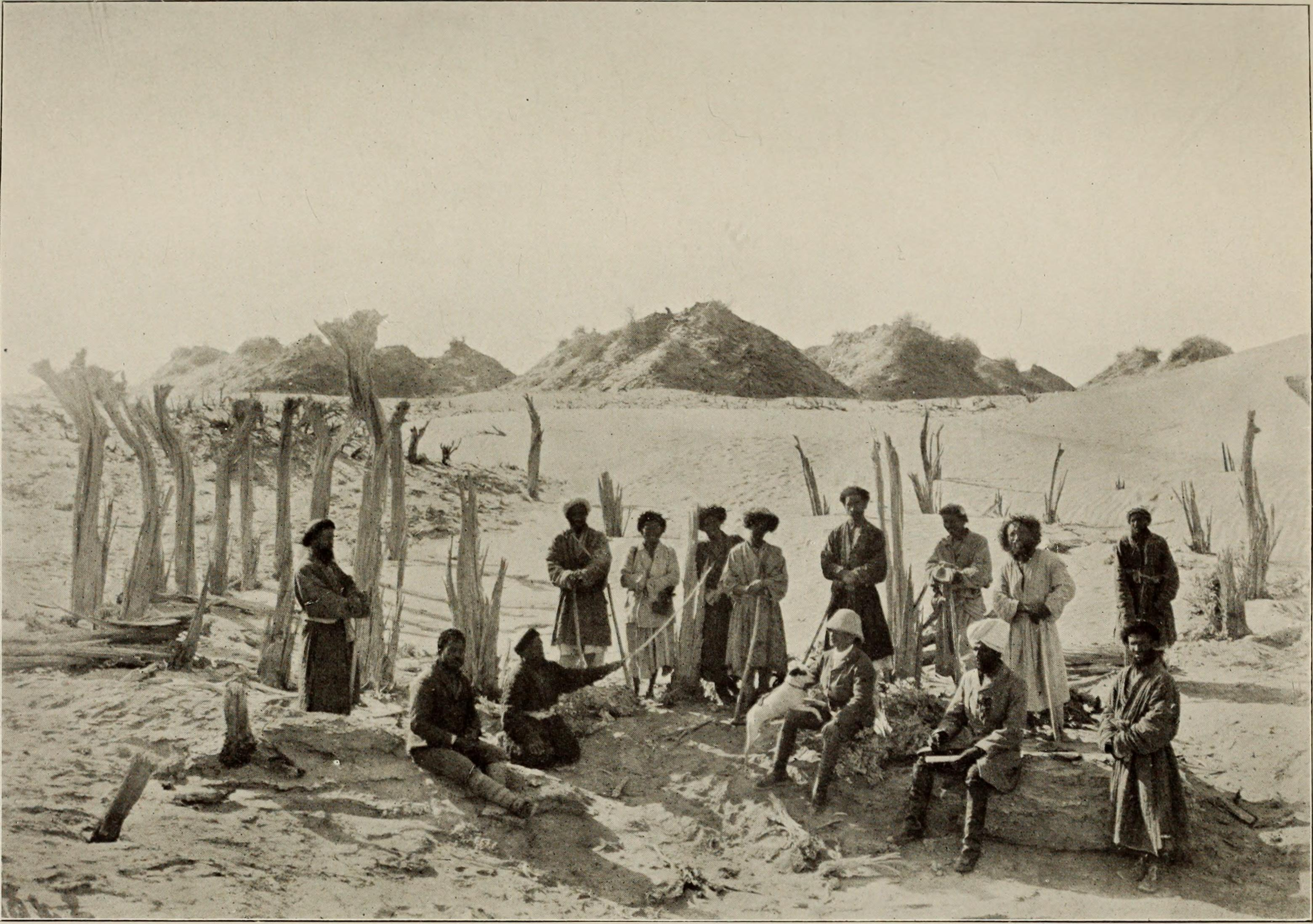
Niya men (1912)

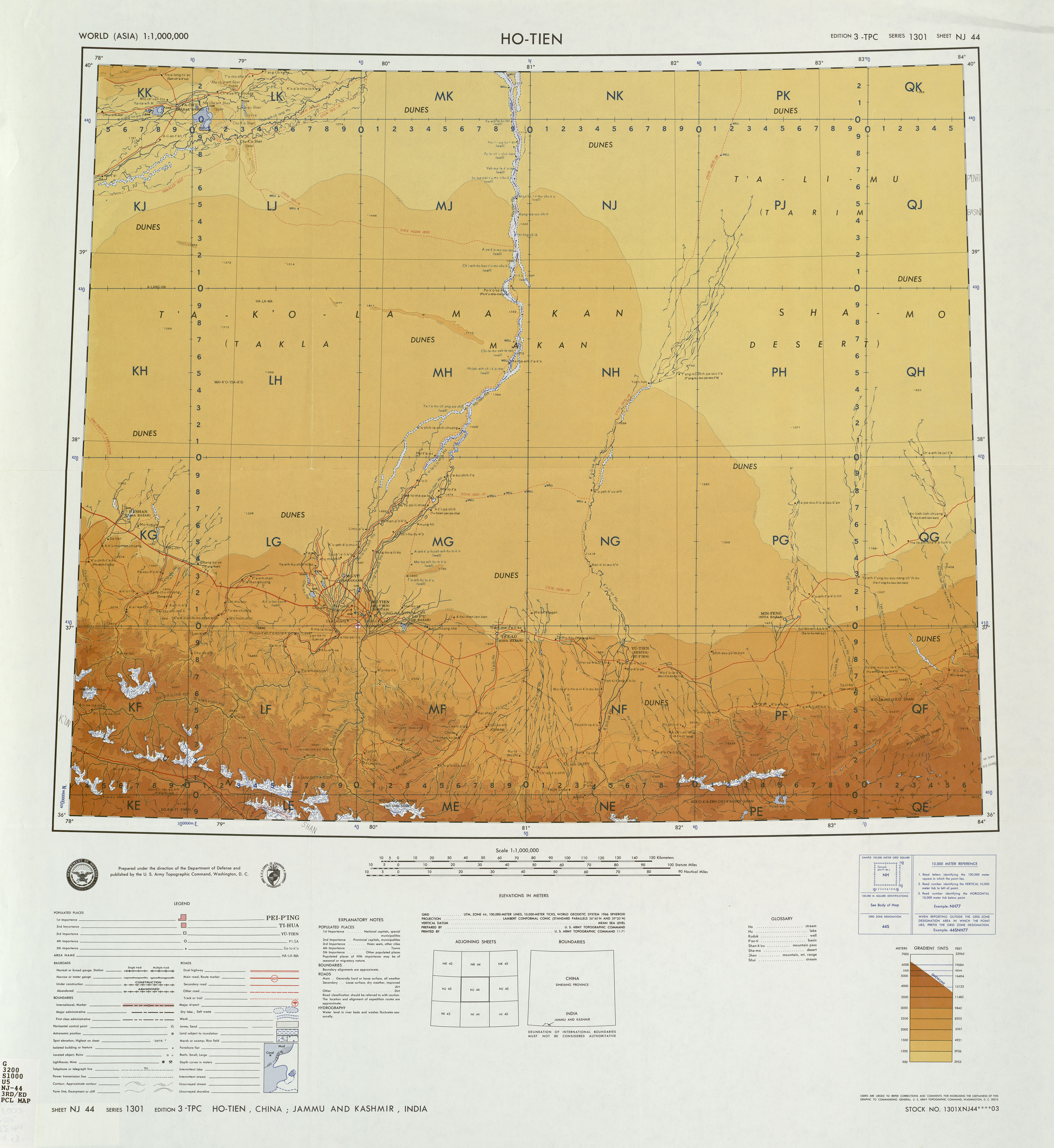
Map including Minfeng (labeled as MIN-FENG (NIYA BAZAR)) and surrounding region in the International Map of the World (ATC, 1971)

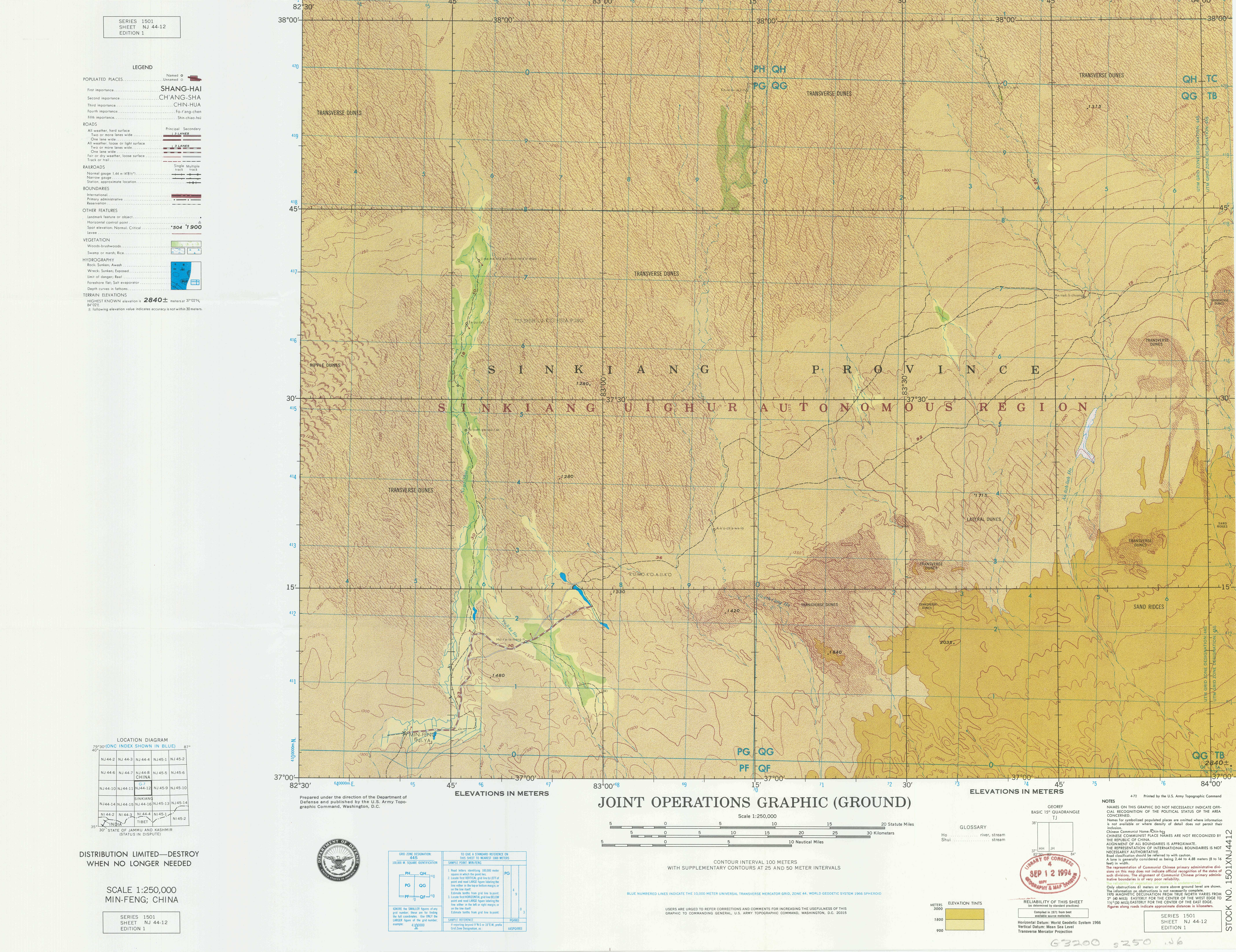
Map including Niya (labeled as MIN-FENG (NI-YA)) (ATC, 1971)

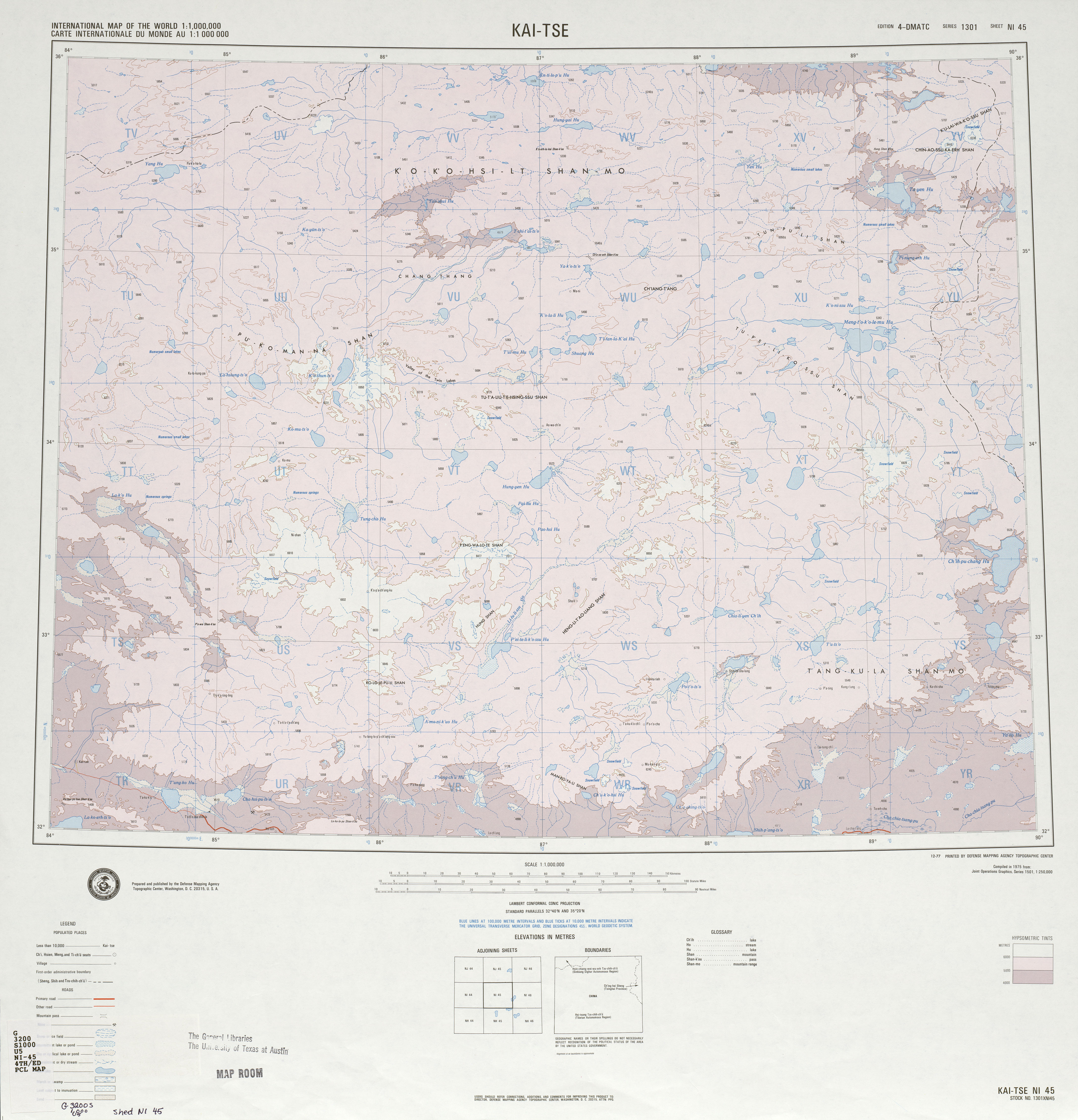
Map including the southern part of Minfeng/Niya County and the county's border with Tibet (DMA, 1975)

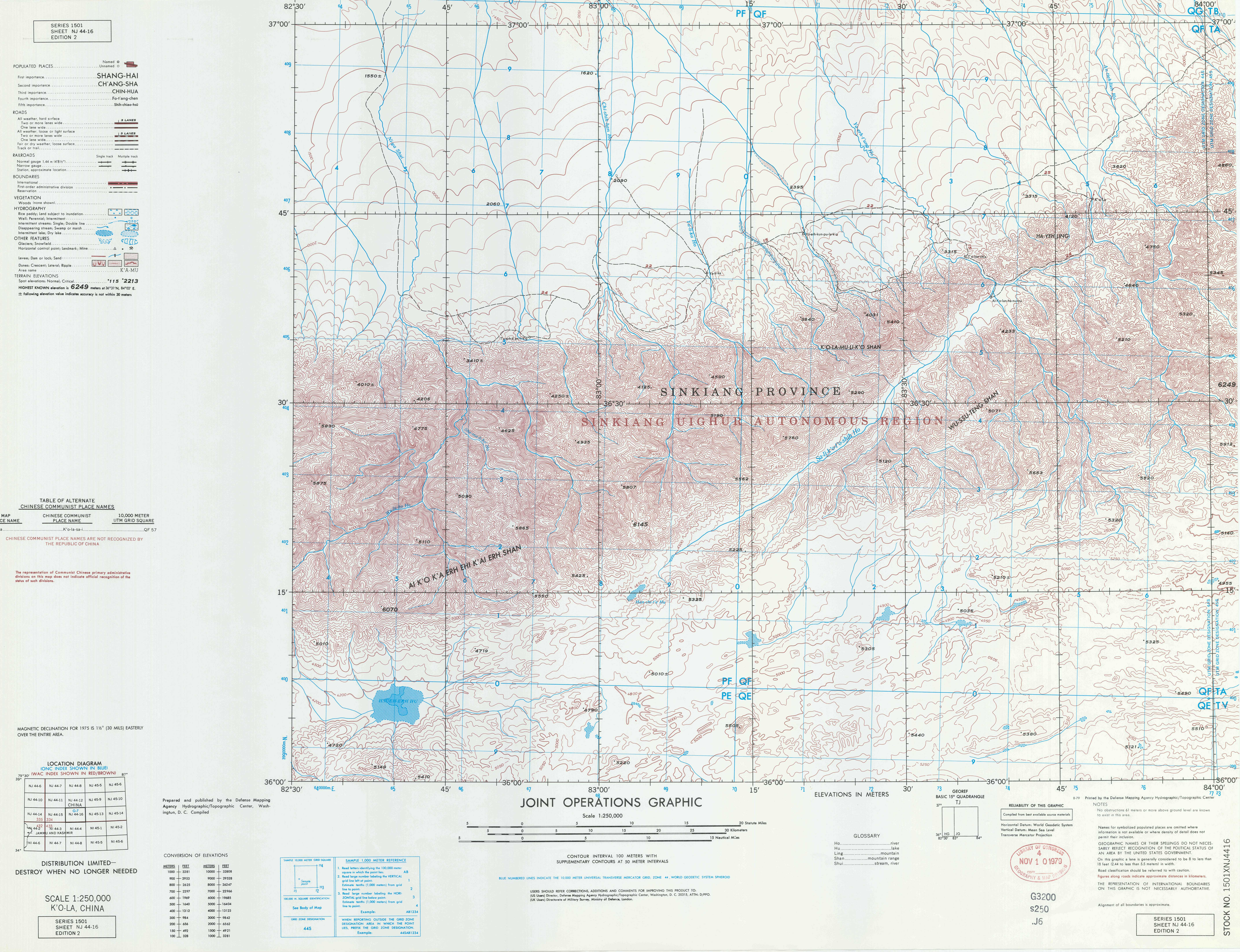
Map including part of Niya (Minfeng) County (DMA, 1979)

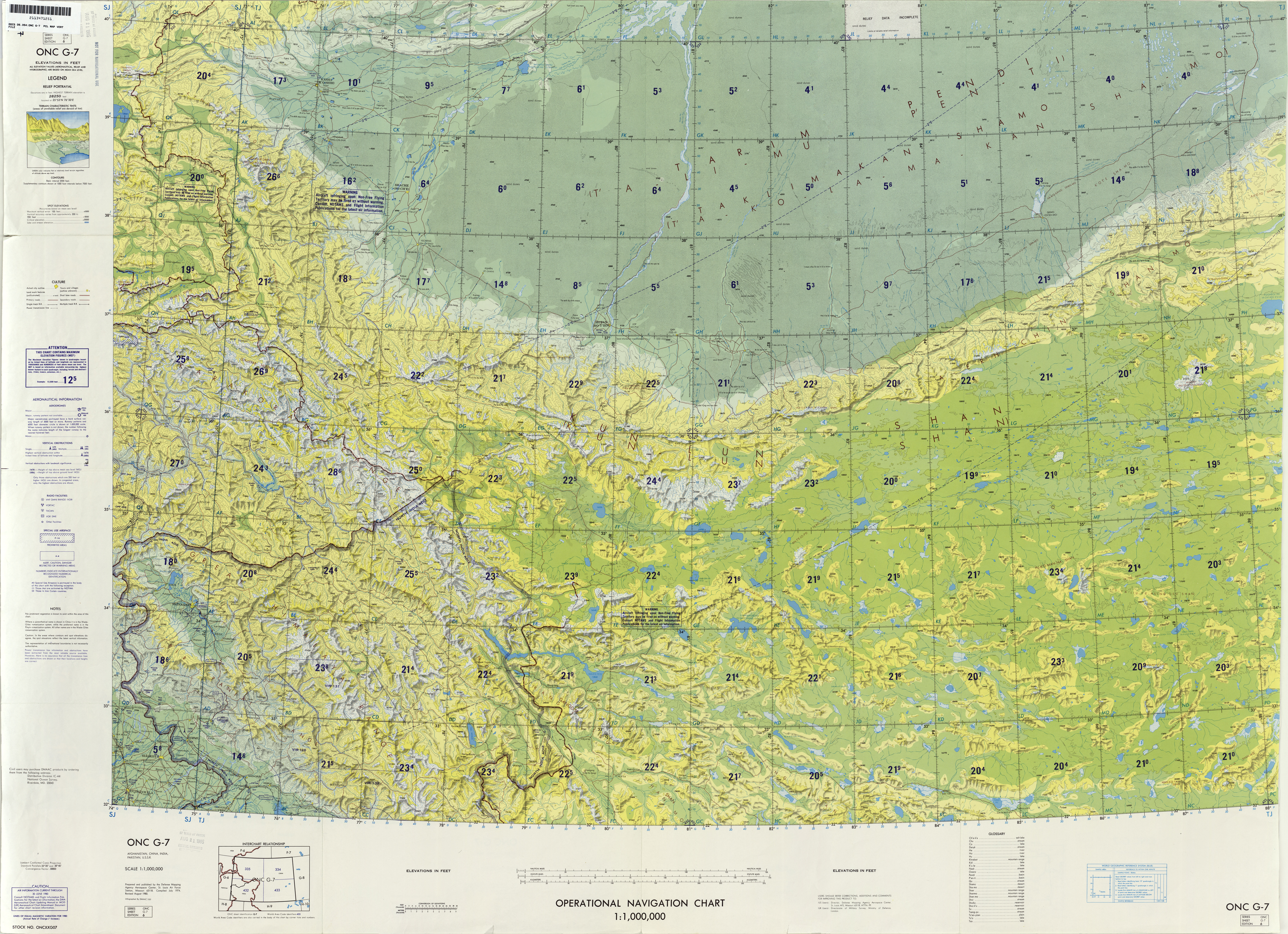
Map including Minfeng (labeled as Minfeng (Min-feng)) and surrounding region (DMA, 1980) (Note: From map: "The representation of international boundaries is not necessarily authoritative.")

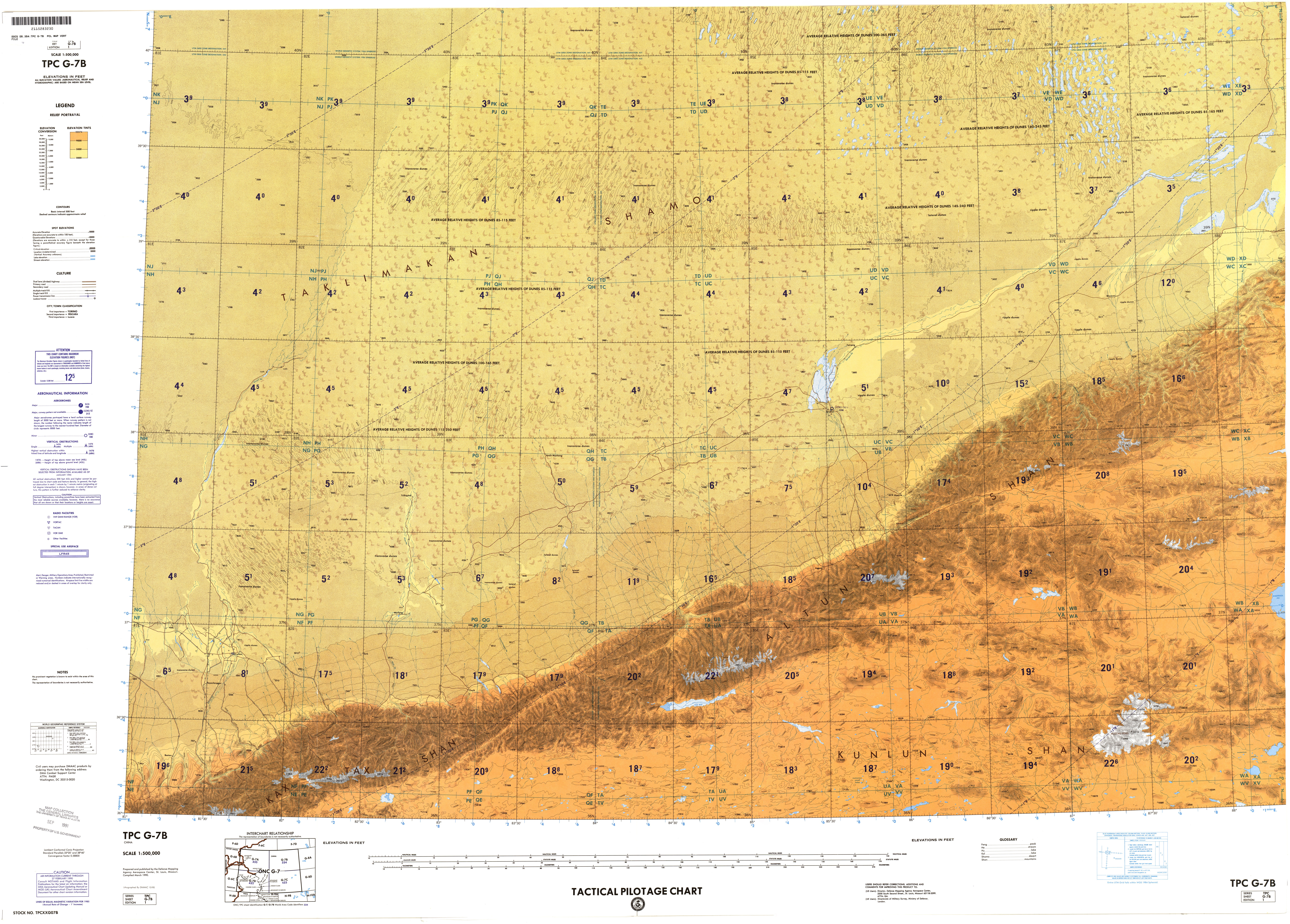
Map including Niya (labeled as Minfeng) (DMA, 1990)
