= Niya Town =

Niya نىيە 尼雅
- Town
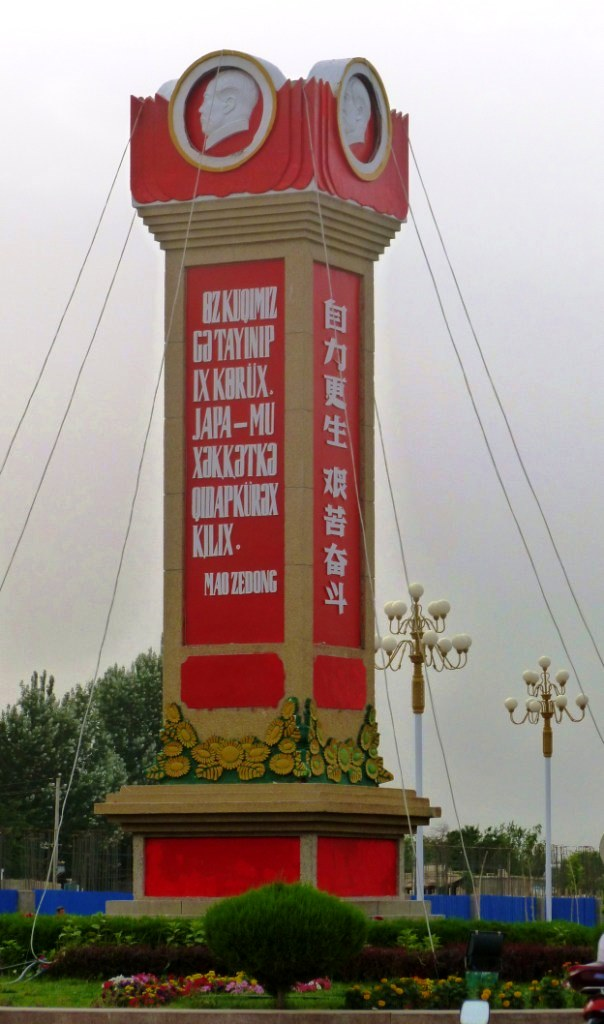
- Monument to Mao Zedong in downtown Minfeng

- Location in Xinjiang
- Coordinates: 37°03′N 82°41′E
- Country: People's Republic of China
- Region: Xinjiang
- Prefecture: Hotan
- County: Minfeng/Niya
- Elevation: 1,405 m (4,610 ft)

Population (2010)
  - Total: 3,486
- Time zone: UTC+8 (China Standard)
- Postal code: 848500

Niya (Uyghur: نىيە Нийә; Chinese: 尼雅; pinyin: Níyǎ), is a town in Minfeng County, Hotan Prefecture, Xinjiang Uygur Autonomous Region, China.

It is the county seat of Minfeng County, and therefore is commonly referred to as Minfeng, and is labeled so on less detailed maps. An ancient town also called Niya is located 115 km to the north of this modern Niya.

== Name ==
The former name for the Niya region was Nina. The word seems to be related to the Greek word nimma (Greek: νίμμα), meaning "pure water". During the Han dynasty, the city was known as Jingjue. This word's Chinese characters mean "pure" or "clean", implying a relation between the two names.

== History ==
Niya/Minfeng was known in ancient time as Ronglu (戎盧) during the Han dynasties (206 BC - 222 AD) and, according to the Hanshu Chapter 96A, was said to have had "240 households, 610 individuals with 300 persons able to bear arms" during the Former Han Dynasty (206 BC - 23 AD). It is situated about 115 km north of the modern town of Minfeng. Numerous Buddhist scriptures, sculptures, mummies and other precious archeological finds have been made in the region. The remains of more than seventy buildings have been discovered scattered over an area of some 45 km^{2}. It was located on the southern branch of the Silk Road.

In the early 20th century, Aurel Stein carried out several expeditions in the area including exploration of the ancient Niya ruins. In 1991, a joint Sino-Japanese expedition dug up the ancient city and established that the original inhabitants of the city may have been members of Alexander the Great's army, settling in the city during Alexander's conquests.

In 2015, Lanpalu was added as a residential community.

In 2017, Ankang, Xingfu, Tuanjie, Hexie, Guangming and Youyi were established as residential communities.

== Geography ==
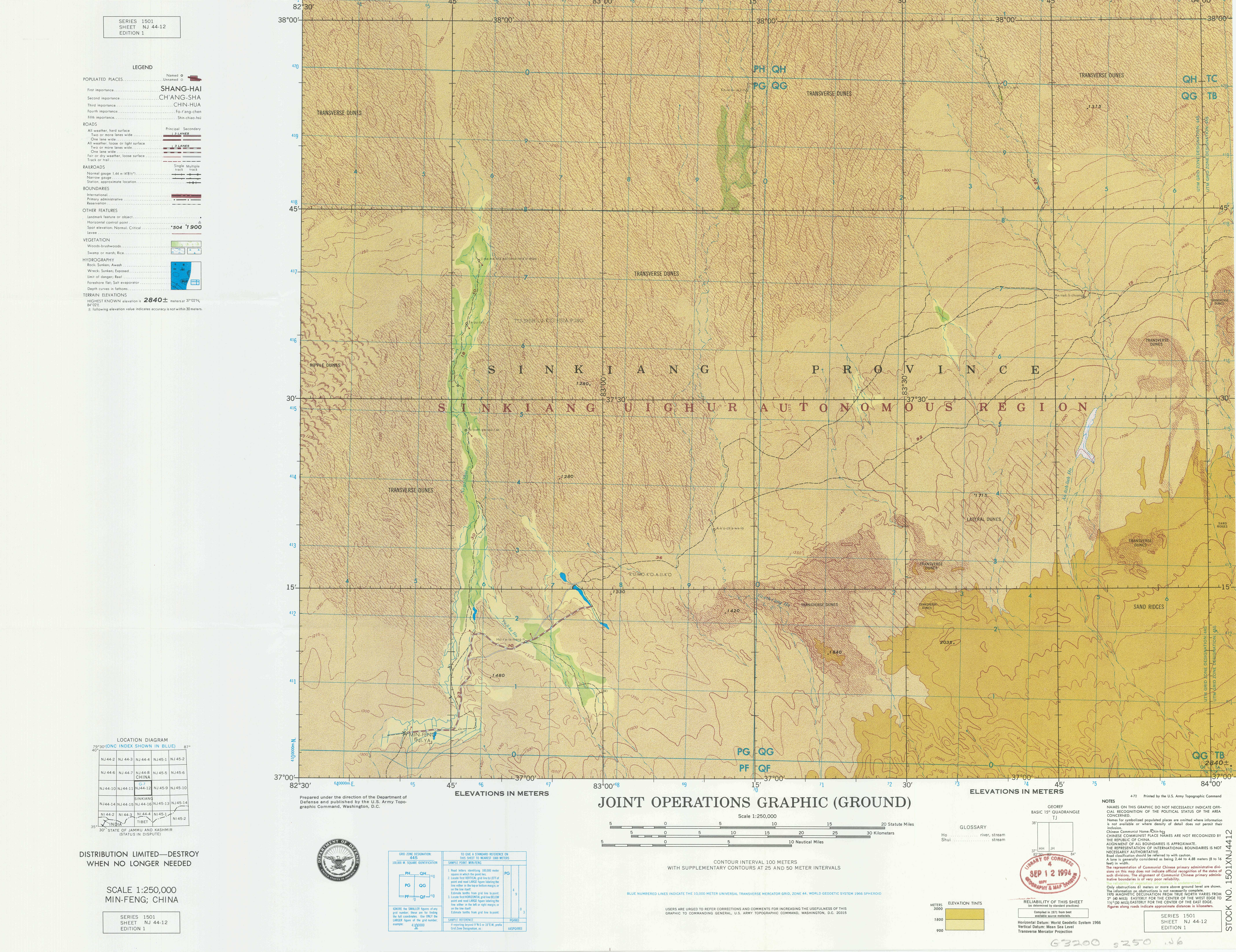
Map including Niya (labeled as MIN-FENG (NI-YA)) (ATC, 1971)

Niya is located on China National Highway 315, which is the main Ruoqiang-Hotan road along the southern edge of the Tarim Basin.

It is situated 120 km east of Keriya, and about 330 km west of Qiemo (Cherchen). Human habitation in the area is possible because of the Niya River, fed by the snows and glaciers of the Kunlun.

Niya is a small town of about 10,000 people with a small market, shops, many restaurants, and a hotel.

== Administrative divisions ==
As of 2018, the county includes ten residential communities and two villages:

Residential communities (Mandarin Chinese Hanyu Pinyin-derived names):

- Bositanlu (博斯坦路居民委员会), Maidiniyetilu (买迪尼也提路居民委员会), Suodalu (索达路居民委员会), Lanpalu (兰帕路居民委员会), Ankang (安康社区居民委员会), Xingfu (幸福社区居民委员会), Tuanjie (团结社区居民委员会), Hexie (和谐社区居民委员会), Guangming (光明社区居民委员会), Youyi (友谊社区居民委员会)

Villages:

- Lanpa (兰帕村委会), Fufuke (甫甫克村委会)

In 2009, the county included:

Residential communities (Mandarin Chinese Hanyu Pinyin-derived names):

- Bositanlu (博斯坦路居民委员会), Maidiniyetilu (买迪尼也提路居民委员会), Suodalu (索达路居民委员会)

Villages:

- Lanpa (兰帕村委会), Fufuke (甫甫克村委会)

== Demographics ==
Historical population
Year	Pop.	±% p.a.
2000	3,684	—
2010	3,486	−0.55%

The population of Niya Town proper declined between the 2000 and 2010 Census.

== Transportation ==
- China National Highway 315
- Minfeng railway station serving the Hotan–Ruoqiang railway

== See also ==
- List of township-level divisions of Xinjiang
