= Toyboldi =

Toyboldi تويبولدى بازىرى 托依堡勒迪镇 Tuoyi Baoledi
- Town
- Location in Xinjiang Toyboldi (China)
- Coordinates: 41°08′17″N 082°49′24″E
- Country: China
- Autonomous Region: Xinjiang
- Prefecture: Aksu
- County: Xayar
- Villages: 25

Area
  - Total: 912 km^{2} (352 sq mi)

Population (2010)
  - Total: 42,227
  - Density: 46.3/km^{2} (120/sq mi)

Ethnic groups
  - Major ethnic groups: Uyghur, Han Chinese
- Time zone: UTC+8 (China Standard)

Toyboldi, also Toy Boldi (Uyghur: تويبولدى بازىرى); or from Mandarin Tuoyi Baoledi (Tuoyibaoledi Chinese: 托依堡勒迪镇) is a town in Xayar County (Shayar, Shaya), Aksu Prefecture, Xinjiang, China.

== Name ==
Toyboldi (تويبولدى) is Uyghur for 'festivity' (喜庆). The village from which the town takes its name was formerly called Tuoyibao (托依堡) which is an abbreviation for Tuoyibo'erdi (托依伯尔底). The village has also been called Tuoyiboluoduo (托伊博罗多).

== History ==
In 1845, Lin Zexu inspected agricultural cultivation efforts in Toyboldi village or a nearby village of the same name further east.

In 1958, Toyboldi Commune (托依堡勒迪公社) was established.

In 1984, Toyboldi Commune became Toyboldi Township (托依堡勒迪乡).

Between May and June 2016, Zhang Shufeng (张树峰), Xayar County education department vice party secretary and director, used public funds on six occasions to hold dinner parties for a rural tourism organization at the Toyboldi Town Central School (托依堡勒迪镇中心学校). Zhang was later stripped of his position due to the incident combined with other problems.

== Geography ==
Toyboldi is 10.2 km (6.3 mi) southeast of the county seat.

== Administrative Divisions ==
Toyboldi includes twenty-five villages:

Villages (Mandarin Chinese Hanyu Pinyin-derived names except where Uyghur is provided):

- Tuoyibaoledi (托依堡勒迪村)
- Kejimata (克吉玛塔村)
- Terek (Tiereke, Tierekecun; تېرەك كەنت / 铁热克村) 41°08′50″N 082°47′06″E
- Kuonatiereke (阔纳铁热克村)
- Paizi'awati (排孜阿瓦提村)
- Serimake (Seri Makecun; 色日马克村) 41°03′16″N 082°51′35″E, Aimai'er Sabi'er (艾麦尔·萨比尔) party secretary (2018)
- Kona chimen (Kuonaqiman; كونا چىمەن كەنت / 阔纳其满村)
- Yingqiman (英其满村)
- Yaleguzitiereke (Yaleguzi Tierekecun; 牙勒古孜铁热克村) 41°04′41″N 082°44′38″E
- Talekebulong (Taleke Bulongcun; 塔勒克布隆村) 41°03′23″N 082°49′31″E
- Langan (Langancun; 栏杆村) 41°02′42″N 082°50′53″E
- Yingyiganqi (英依干其村)
- Yingkuokebuyun (英阔克布运村)
- Segezileke (色格孜勒克村)
- Shengli (Shenglicun; 胜利村) 41°09′09″N 082°49′12″E
- Kumu'airike (Kumu Airikecun; 库木艾日克村) 41°05′03″N 082°38′45″E
- Kalakumu (喀拉库木村) 41°04′18″N 082°55′21″E
- Akelike (阿克力克村)
- Yinongchang (一农场村)
- Ernongchang (Ernongchangcun; 二农场村) 41°04′18″N 082°56′36″E
- Sannongchang (Sannongchangcun; 三农场村) 41°06′43″N 082°46′44″E
- Sinongchang (Sinongchangcun, No. 4 Farm; 四农场村) 41°03′02″N 082°59′03″E
- Yuanyichang (园艺场村)
- Salasiti (Salasiticun; 萨拉斯提村) 41°00′06″N 083°02′35″E
- Aketamu (阿克塔木村)

Former village:

- Yingbage (英巴格村)

== Economy ==
The main agricultural products of the town are wheat, corn, and cotton. Money making products include fennel and pijiuhua (啤酒花). Animal husbandry and fish farming are common in the surrounding area. The area is one of the main producers of sanbeiyang (三北羊) lambskin. A farmer's market is held on Tuesdays.

== Demographics ==
Historical population
Year	Pop.	±% p.a.
2000	38,425	—
2010	42,227	+0.95%

As of 1997, 74.7% of the population of Toyboldi was Uyghur and 22.5% was Han Chinese.

== Transportation ==
In the mid-1990s, a metalled road was built linking Toyboldi (Toy Boldi) to the county seat.
