= Yeyik =

Yeyik: Uyghur: يېيىق يېزىسى; Chinese: 叶亦克乡; Yeyike, Yeh-i-k'o
- Township
- Location in Xinjiang
- Coordinates: 36°40′41″N 083°10′52″E
- Country: China
- Autonomous Region: Xinjiang
- Prefecture: Hotan
- County: Niya (Minfeng)
- Villages: 6
- Elevation: 3,300 m (10,800 ft)

Population (2010)
  - Total: 3,751

Ethnic groups
  - Major ethnic groups: Uyghur
- Time zone: UTC+8 (China Standard)

Yeyik (Uyghur: يېيىق يېزىسى; Chinese: 叶亦克乡) is a township in central Niya County (Minfeng), Hotan Prefecture, Xinjiang, China on the upper reaches of the Yeyik River (叶亦克河).

== Name ==
Yeyik means 'spread out' (铺展) in Uyghur. The Uyghur is transcribed into Mandarin Chinese as Yeyike (pinyin) (Yeh-i-k'o (Wade-Giles)). Yeyik has also been known as Yiyike (乙衣克) and Ya-li-ka.

== History ==
In 1958, Yeyik Commune (叶亦克公社) was established.

In 1984, Yeyik Commune became Yeyik Township (叶亦克乡).

At 5:24 p.m. on February 12, 2014, Yeyik was 88 km (55 mi) from the epicenter of a 5.7 magnitude aftershock of the 2014 Yutian earthquake.

In September 2018, Yeyik was listed as a Strong Town Model Organization in Agricultural Production (农业产业强镇示范建设).

== Geography ==
Yeyik is located 44 km (27 mi) to the southeast of the county seat on an alluvial fan on the upper reaches of the Yeyik River (Yeh-i-k'o Ho, Ya-li-ka Ho; 叶亦克河).

== Administrative divisions ==
Yeyik includes six villages:

Villages (Mandarin Chinese Hanyu Pinyin-derived names except where Uyghur is provided):

- Ayitage (阿依塔格村) 36°44′12″N 082°59′51″E
- Yeyik (Yeyike; يېيىق كەنت / 叶亦克村)
- Muchang (牧场村)
- Jinquan (金泉村) 36°39′37″N 083°23′12″E
- Aqtash (Aketashi; ئاقتاش كەنت / 阿克塔什村)
- Yengiawat (Ying'awati; يېڭىئاۋات كەنت / 英阿瓦提村)

Former villages:

- Kunwu'ertuzi (昆吾尔吐孜村)
- Segeziwuyi (色格孜乌依村) 36°44′01″N 083°09′48″E

== Economy ==
Agriculture and animal husbandry are the mainstays of the economy. Crops include wheat, highland barley, black-eyed peas, etc.

== Demographics ==
Historical population
Year	Pop.	±% p.a.
2000	3,623	—
2010	3,751	+0.35%

== Nature and wildlife ==
A Demoiselle Crane was tracked passing through Yeyik suggesting that Yeyik is a stopover on the autumn migration route of the Demoiselle Crane.

== Historical maps ==
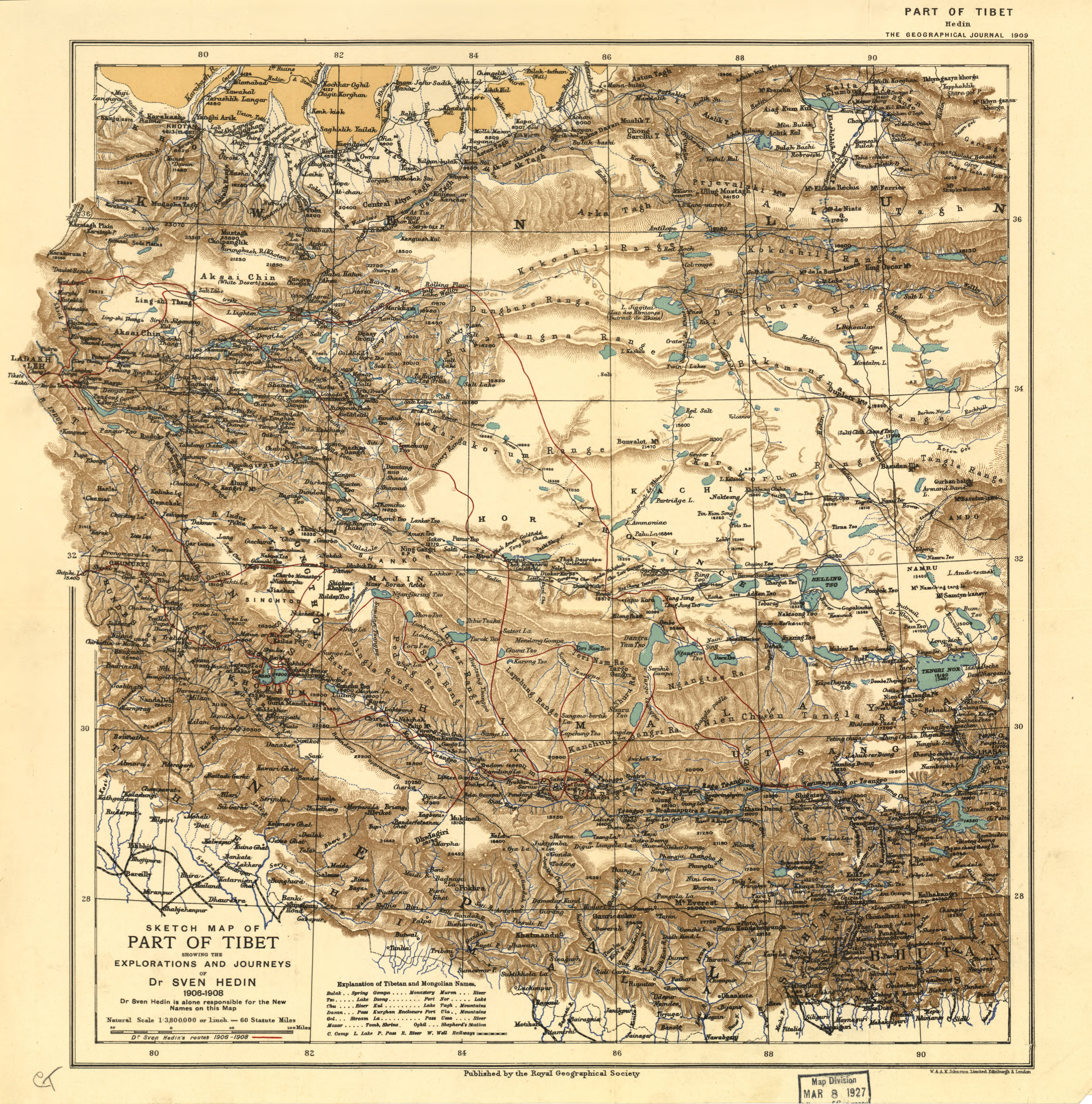
Map of the expeditions of Sven Hedin (1906-8) including Yeyik (labeled as Yayek) (RGS, early 20th century)

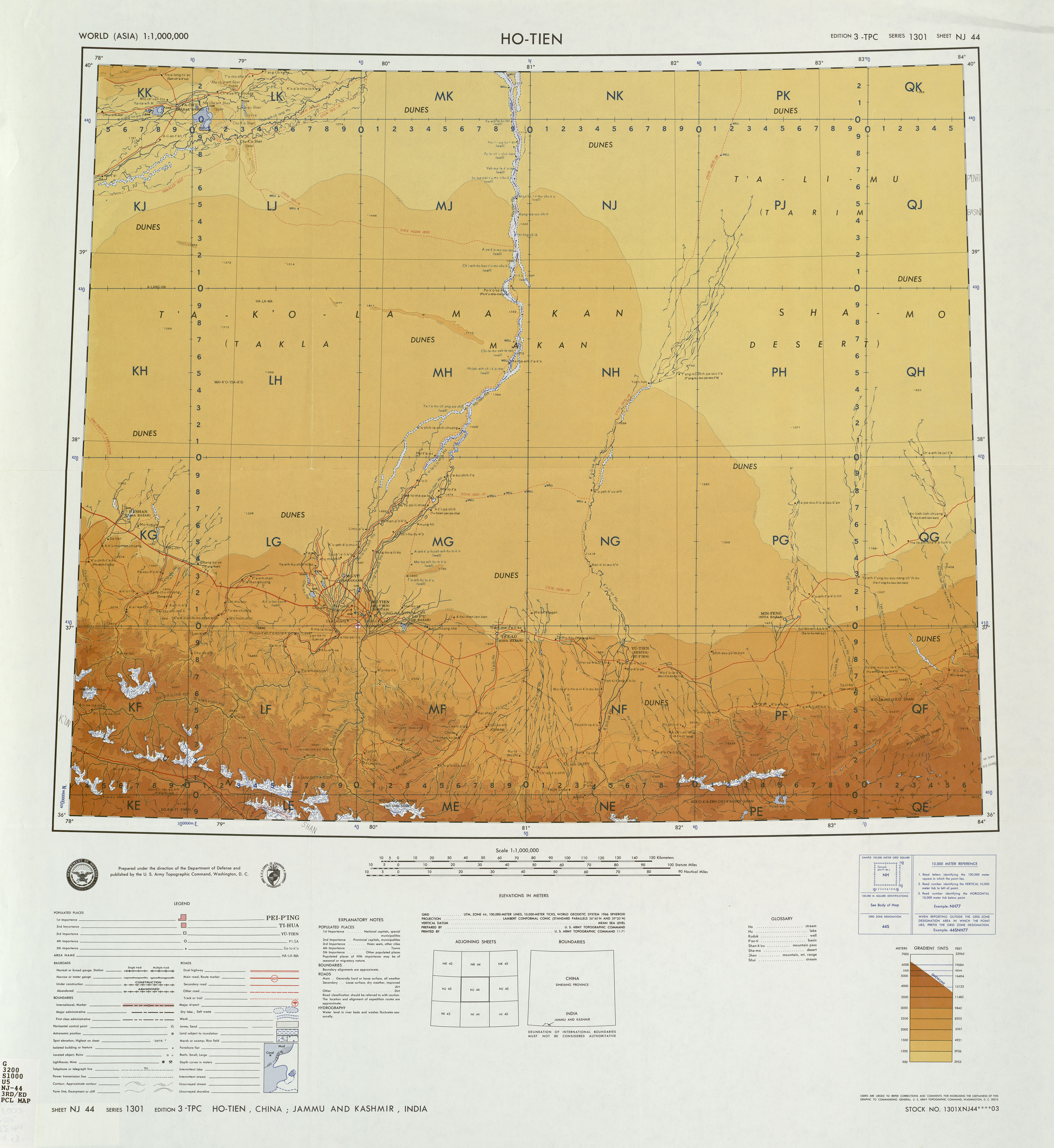
Map including Yeyik (labeled as Ya-li-ka (Yeh-i-k'o)) and surrounding region in the International Map of the World (ATC, 1971)

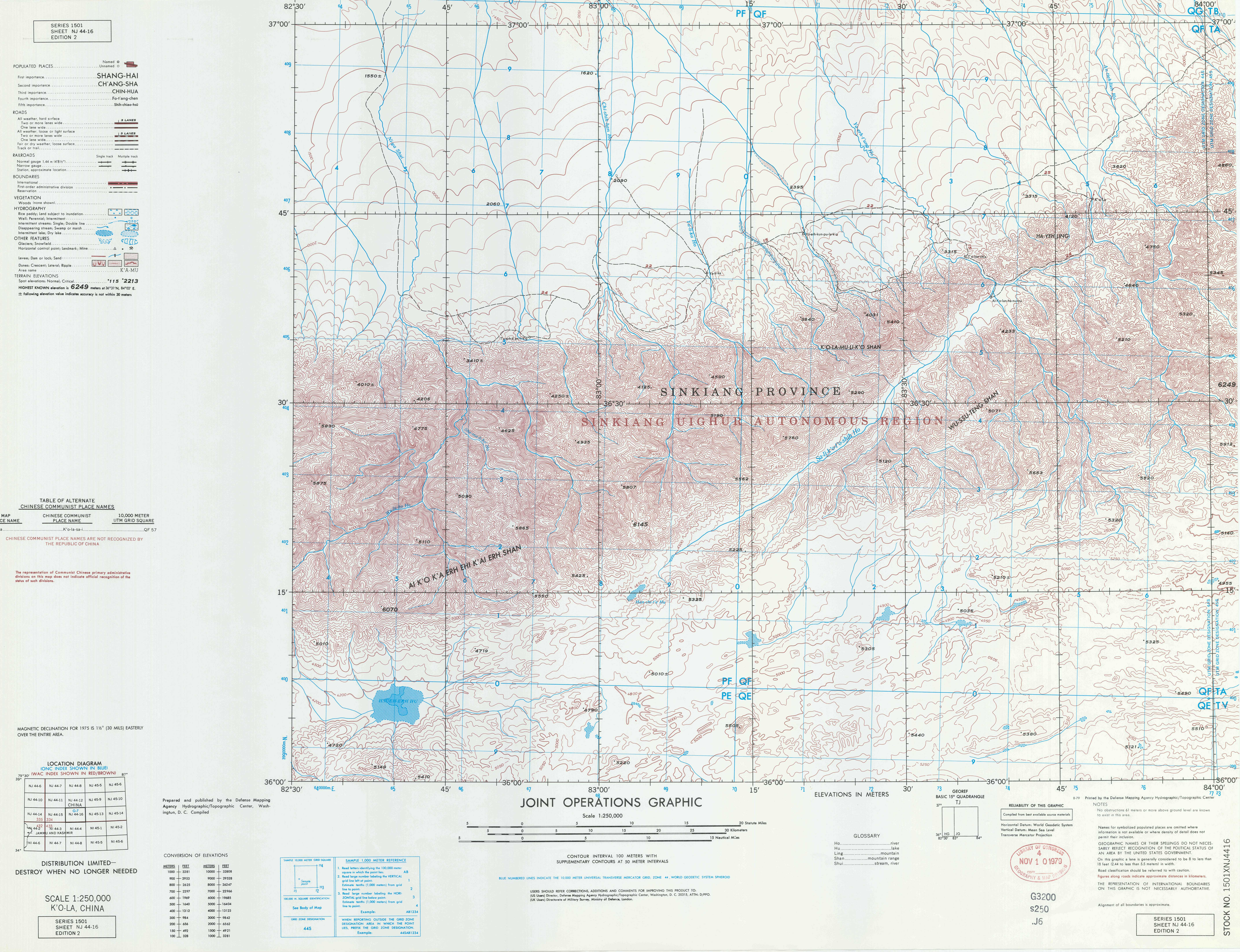
Map including Yeyik (labeled as Ya-li-ka) (DMA, 1979)

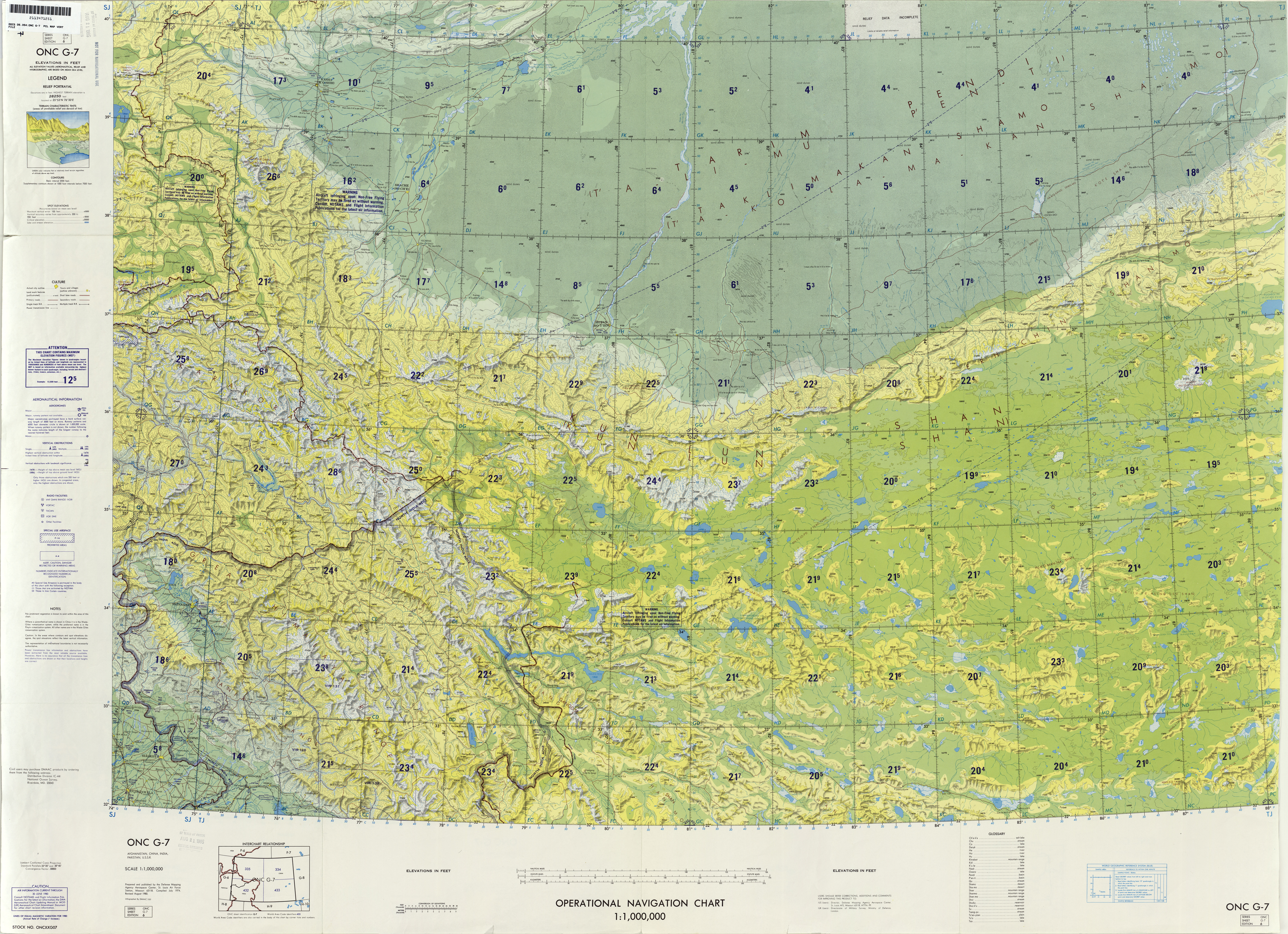
Map including Yeyik (Yeh-i-kʻo) and surrounding region (DMA, 1980) (Note: From map: "The representation of international boundaries is not necessarily authoritative.")

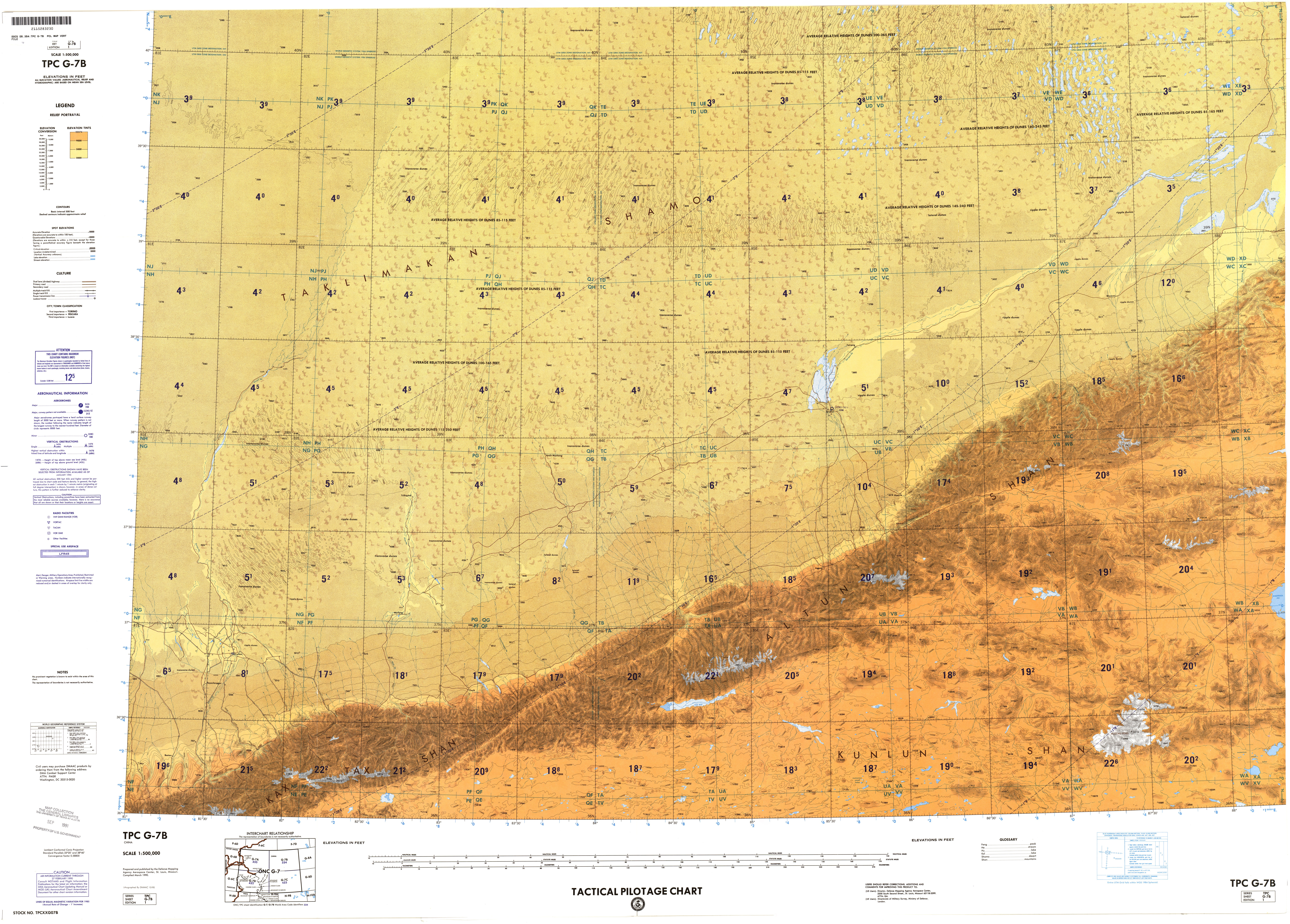
Map including Yeyik (DMA, 1990)

== See also ==
- List of township-level divisions of Xinjiang
