= Xayar County =

Xayar County شايار ناھىيىسى (Uyghur) 沙雅县 (Chinese) Shayar, Shaya
- County
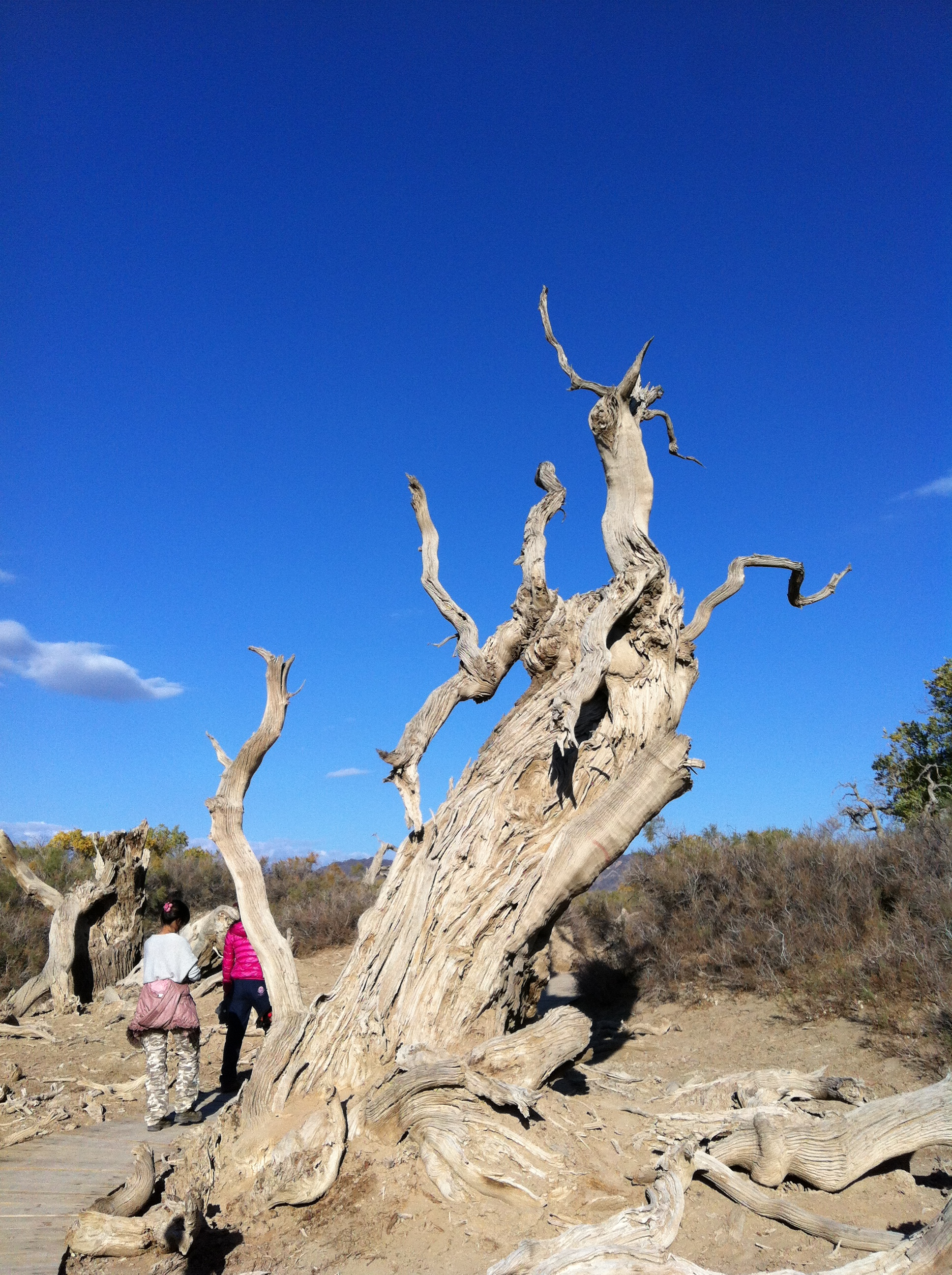
- Huyanglin Nature Reserve

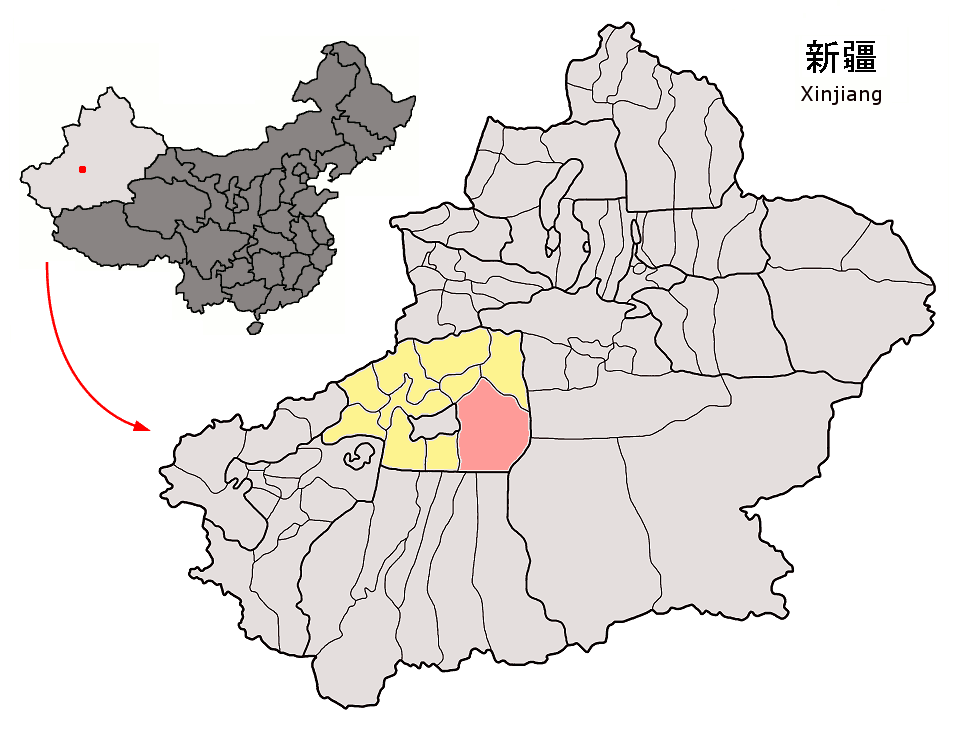
- Location of Shayar County (red) within Aksu Prefecture (yellow) and Xinjiang

- Location of the seat Xayar County (China)
- Coordinates: 41°13′48″N 82°48′21″E
- Country: China
- Autonomous region: Xinjiang
- Prefecture: Aksu
- Established date: 1902
- County seat: Xayar Town (Shayar, Shaya)

Area
  - Total: 31,887.28 km^{2} (12,311.75 sq mi)

Population (2020)
  - Total: 278,516
  - Density: 8.73439/km^{2} (22.6220/sq mi)

Ethnic groups
  - Major ethnic groups: Uyghur
- Time zone: UTC+8 (China Standard (Note: Locals in Xinjiang frequently observe UTC+6 (Xinjiang Time), 2 hours behind Beijing.))
- Postal code: 842200
- Website: www.xjsy.gov.cn (in Chinese)

Xayar County

Uyghur name
- Uyghur: شايار ناھىيىسى
Transcriptions
- Latin Yëziqi: Shayar Nahiyisi
- Yengi Yeziⱪ: Xayar Naⱨiyisii
- SASM/GNC: Xayar Nahiyisi
- Siril Yëziqi: Шайар Наһийиси

Chinese name
- Simplified Chinese: 沙雅县
- Traditional Chinese: 沙雅縣
Transcriptions
Standard Mandarin
- Hanyu Pinyin: Shāyǎ Xiàn
- Wade–Giles: Sha¹-ya³ Hsien⁴

Xayar County, also Shayar County or, from Mandarin Chinese, Shaya, is a county in the Xinjiang Uyghur Autonomous Region and is under the administration of the Aqsu Prefecture. It contains an area of 31,868 km^{2} (12,304 sq mi). According to the 2004 census it has a population of 210,000.

== History ==
In 1902, Xayar County was established.

In March 1964, Tarim Farm (塔里木农场) was founded. In 1970, Tarim Farm was renamed Nong Yi Shi 15th Regiment (农一师十五团). In 1973, Nong Yi Shi 15th Regiment was renamed Third Laogai Detachment (第三劳改支队). As of 1982, the prison had a cotton processing factory. In 1985, Third Laogai Detachment was renamed Tarim Laogai Detachment (塔里木劳改支队). In 1994, Tarim Laogai Detachment was renamed Tarim Prison (塔里木监狱).

On July 15, 1996, a prison rebellion in Xayar County led to the deaths of fifteen.

In 1998, Tarim Prison was renamed Xayar Prison (沙雅监狱).

In June 2008, Gezqum Township (Gaizikumu) was established. On December 30, 2008, the township's government started operation.

In 2011, Yantaqsheher Township (Yangtakexiehai'er) was established.

In 2012, Xadadong (Hadedun) was established. On February 25, 2013, the town's government started operation.

On May 26, 2014, Gulbagh (Gulebage), then a township, was made a town.

== Administrative divisions ==
Xayar County included seven towns, four townships and four other areas:

Name	Simplified Chinese	Hanyu Pinyin	Uyghur (UEY)	Uyghur Latin (ULY)	Administrative division code	Notes
Towns
Xayar Town	沙雅镇	Shāyǎ Zhèn	شايار بازىرى	shayar baziri	652924100	
Toyboldi Town	托依堡勒迪镇	Tuōyībǎolèdí Zhèn	تويبولدى بازىرى	toyboldi baziri	652924101	formerly Toyboldi Township (托依堡勒迪乡)
Qizilbayraq Town	红旗镇	Hóngqí Zhèn	قىزىلبايراق بازىرى	qizilbayraq baziri	652924102	formerly Toyboldi Township (红旗乡)
Yengimehelle Town	英买里镇	Yīngmǎilì Zhèn	يېڭىمەھەللە بازىرى	yëngimehelle baziri	652924103	formerly Yengimehelle Township (英买里乡)
Xadadong Town	哈德墩镇	Hādédūn Zhèn	خادادۆڭ بازىرى	xadadöng baziri	652924104	
Gülbag Town	古勒巴格镇	Gǔlèbāgé Zhèn	گۈلباغ بازىرى	gülbagh baziri	652924105	formerly Gülbag Township (古勒巴格乡)
Qaylor	海楼镇	Hǎilóu Zhèn	قايلور بازىرى	qaylor baziri	652924106	formerly Qaylor Township (海楼乡)
Townships
Nurbagh Township	努尔巴格乡	Nǔ'ěrbāgé Xiāng	نۇرباغ يېزىسى	nurbagh yëzisi	652924205	
Tarim Township	塔里木乡	Tǎlǐmù Xiāng	تارىم يېزىسى	tarim yëzisi	652924206	
Gezqum Township	盖孜库木乡	Gàizīkùmù Xiāng	گەزقۇم يېزىسى	gezqum yëzisi	652924207	
Yantaqsheher Township	央塔克协海尔乡	Yāngtǎkèxiéhǎi'ěr Xiāng	يانتاقشەھەر يېزىسى	yantaqsheher yëzisi	652924208	

Other areas: Xinken Farm (新垦农场), No. 2 Pasture (二牧场), Xayar Prison (Xinjiang Shaya Prison, 沙雅监狱), Xayar County Industrial Zone (沙雅县工业集中区).

== Climate ==
Climate data for Xayar, elevation 983 m (3,225 ft), (1991–2020 normals, extremes 1981–present)
Month	Jan	Feb	Mar	Apr	May	Jun	Jul	Aug	Sep	Oct	Nov	Dec	Year
Record high °C (°F)	7.6 (45.7)	18.1 (64.6)	26.6 (79.9)	35.8 (96.4)	36.4 (97.5)	38.9 (102.0)	40.5 (104.9)	41.2 (106.2)	36.7 (98.1)	30.0 (86.0)	21.4 (70.5)	10.5 (50.9)	41.2 (106.2)
Mean daily maximum °C (°F)	−0.4 (31.3)	6.5 (43.7)	15.4 (59.7)	23.7 (74.7)	28.4 (83.1)	31.7 (89.1)	33.1 (91.6)	31.9 (89.4)	27.6 (81.7)	20.6 (69.1)	10.7 (51.3)	1.3 (34.3)	19.2 (66.6)
Daily mean °C (°F)	−6.8 (19.8)	−0.3 (31.5)	8.5 (47.3)	16.4 (61.5)	21.1 (70.0)	24.6 (76.3)	25.9 (78.6)	24.8 (76.6)	19.9 (67.8)	11.8 (53.2)	3.0 (37.4)	−4.7 (23.5)	12.0 (53.6)
Mean daily minimum °C (°F)	−12.0 (10.4)	−6.1 (21.0)	2.2 (36.0)	9.8 (49.6)	14.5 (58.1)	18.1 (64.6)	19.6 (67.3)	18.6 (65.5)	13.5 (56.3)	5.2 (41.4)	−2.4 (27.7)	−9.1 (15.6)	6.0 (42.8)
Record low °C (°F)	−24.2 (−11.6)	−22.9 (−9.2)	−9.7 (14.5)	−2.0 (28.4)	2.2 (36.0)	8.0 (46.4)	10.9 (51.6)	9.7 (49.5)	3.9 (39.0)	−3.3 (26.1)	−14.2 (6.4)	−22.6 (−8.7)	−24.2 (−11.6)
Average precipitation mm (inches)	1.3 (0.05)	2.3 (0.09)	0.6 (0.02)	3.5 (0.14)	5.4 (0.21)	12.7 (0.50)	10.2 (0.40)	11.2 (0.44)	6.3 (0.25)	2.3 (0.09)	3.7 (0.15)	1.3 (0.05)	60.8 (2.39)
Average precipitation days (≥ 0.1 mm)	2.0	1.4	0.8	1.2	2.7	5.3	6.1	4.9	3.0	0.9	0.9	1.7	30.9
Average snowy days	4.4	1.7	0.2	0.2	0	0	0	0	0	0	0.7	4.6	11.8
Average relative humidity (%)	66	53	39	34	35	41	46	49	51	55	58	68	50
Mean monthly sunshine hours	187.2	197.7	227.8	249.5	288.7	294.5	304.3	283.7	267.8	260.7	208.1	172.2	2,942.2
Percentage possible sunshine	63	65	61	62	64	65	67	68	73	78	72	60	67
Source: China Meteorological Administrationall-time February highall-time September high

== Economy ==
Agriculture and animal husbandry are equally strong in the county. Agricultural products include wheat, corn and cotton as well as melons, yema (野麻), walnut, velvet antler, muskrat, and licorice root. The county is the main location for Sanbei Sheep (三北羊) lambskin production. Industries include knitting, leather making, food processing and others.

The seven major speciality products of the county include Tarim Huyang, cotton, red deer, dates, Karakul sheep, salt cedar, and sword-leaf dogbane.

As of 1885, there was about 45,900 acres (303,747 mu) of cultivated land in Xayar.

== Demographics ==
Historical population
Year	Pop.	±% p.a.
2000	202,992	—
2010	257,502	+2.41%

As of 2015, 230,129 of the 274,382 residents of the county were Uyghur, 41,463 were Han Chinese and 2,790 were from other ethnic groups.

Most residents of Xayar are Muslim Uyghurs.

As of 1999, 84.05% of the population of Xayar (Shaya) County was Uyghur and 14.6% of the population was Han Chinese.

== Transportation ==
- China National Highway 217

== Historical maps ==
Historical English-language maps including Xayar:

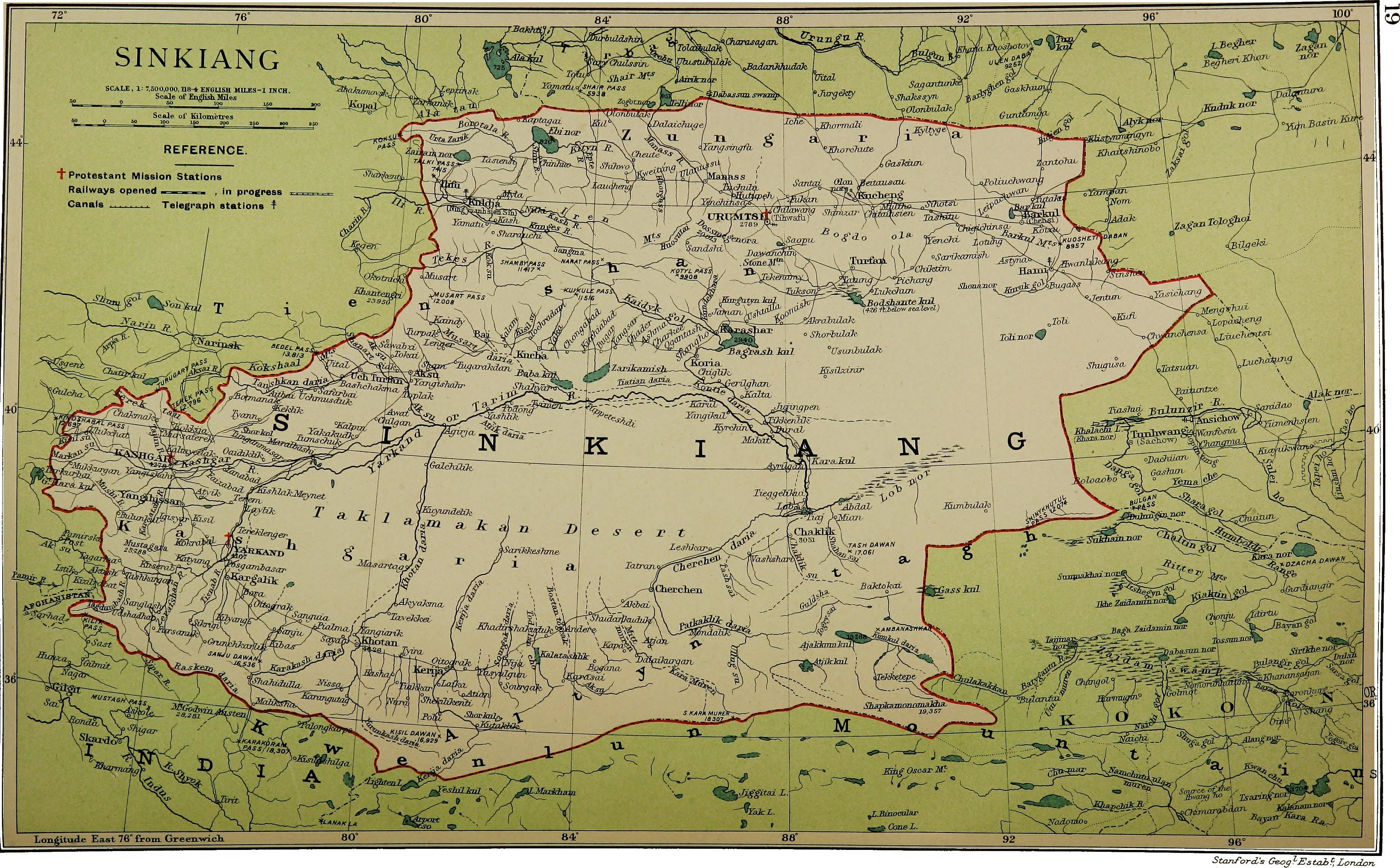
Map including Xayar (labeled as Shahyar) (1917)

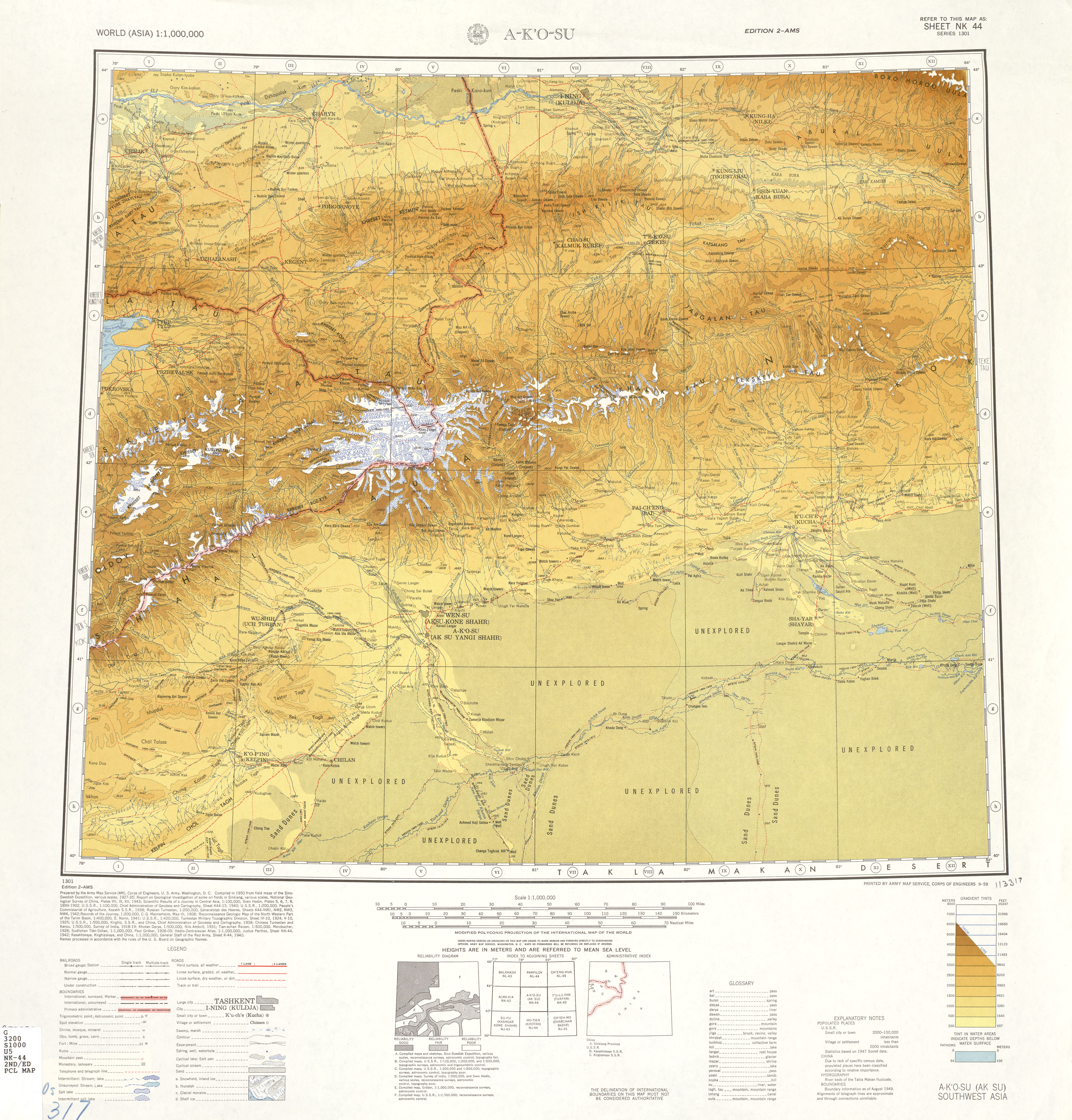
Map including Xayar and surrounding region from the International Map of the World (AMS, 1950) (Note: From map: "THE DELINEATION OF INTERNATIONAL BOUNDARIES ON THIS MAP MUST NOT BE CONSIDERED AUTHORITATIVE")

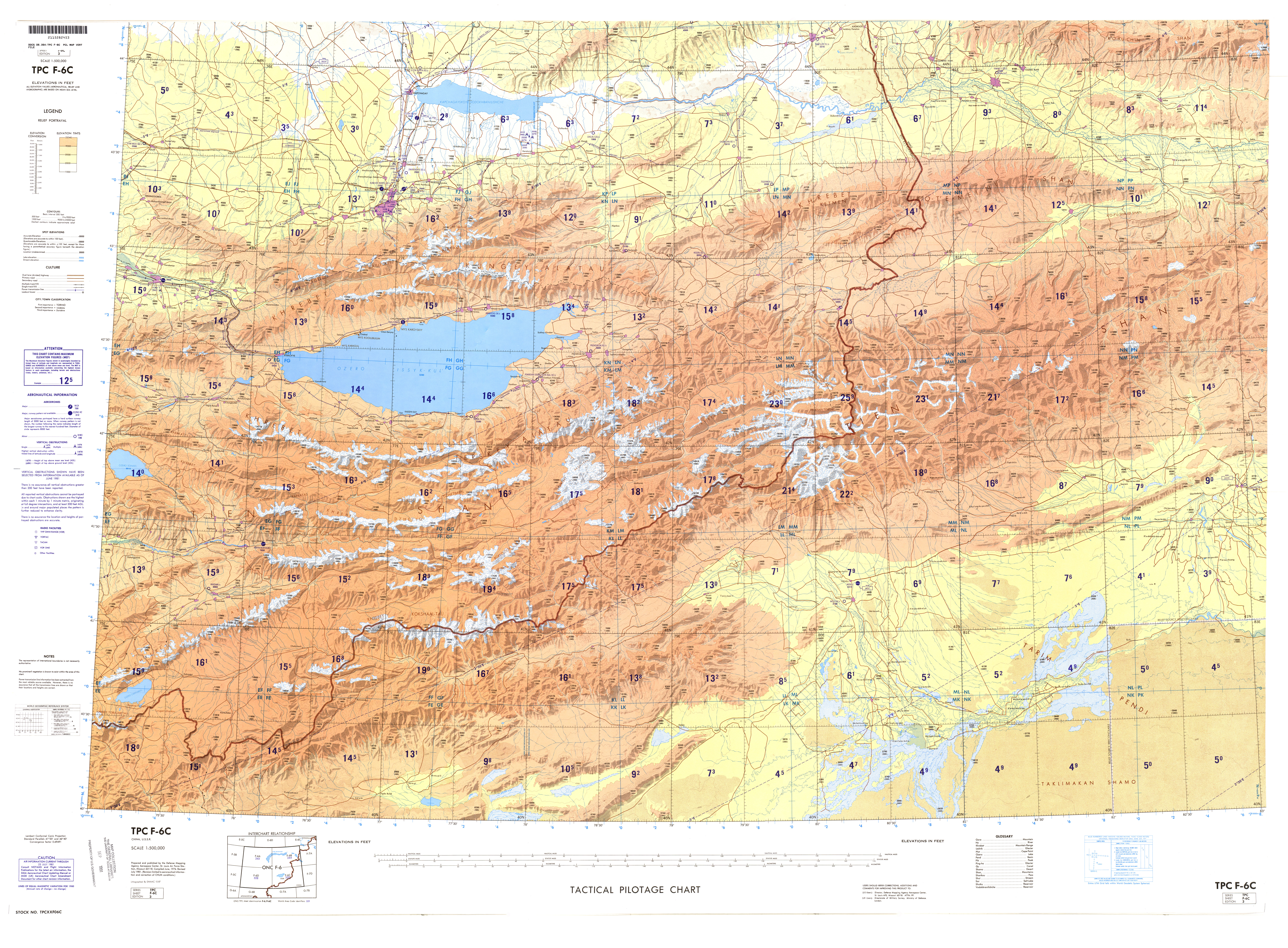
Map including Xayar (DMA, 1981)

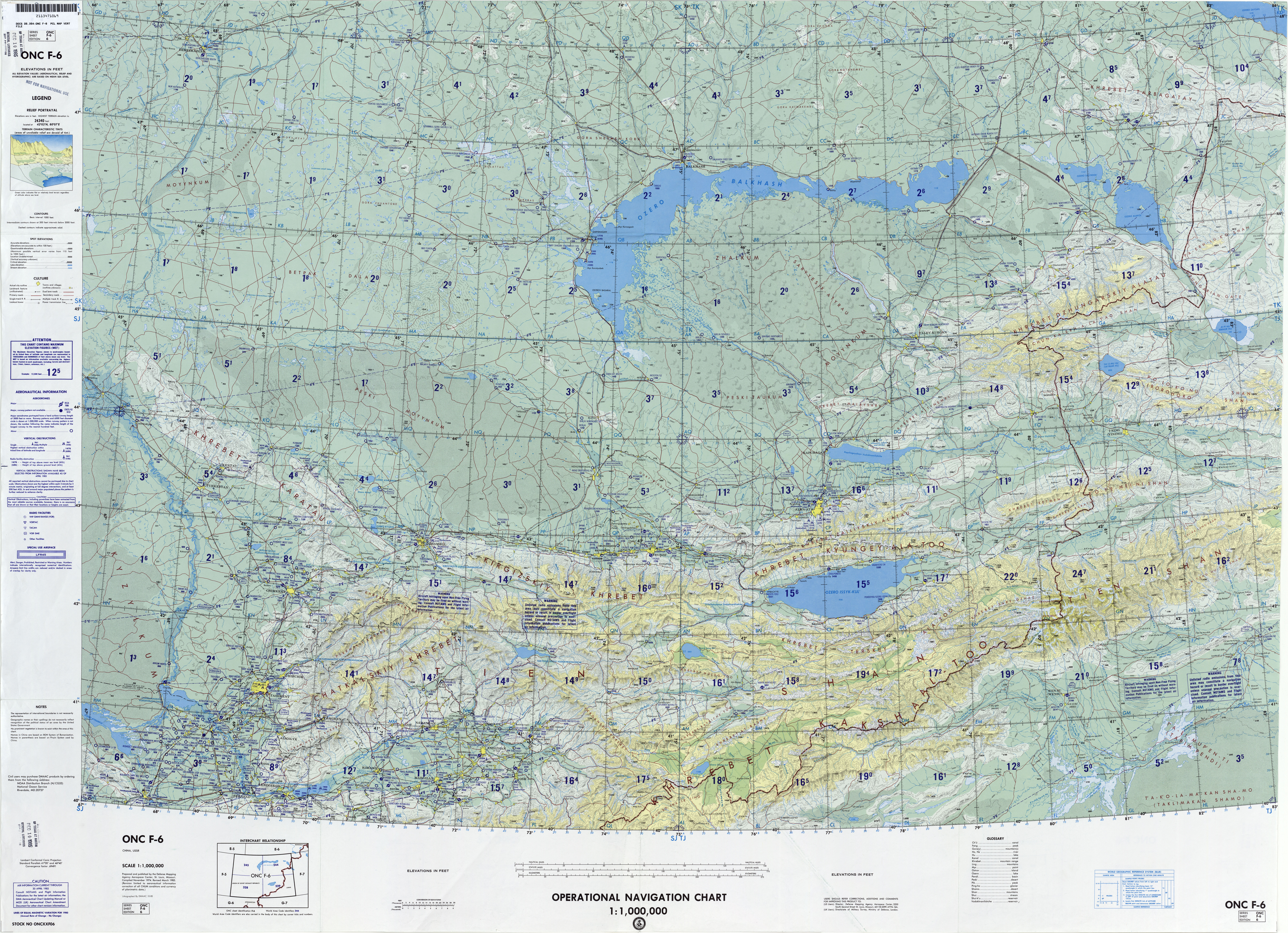
From the Operational Navigation Chart; map including Xayar (labeled as Sha-ya [Xayar]; DMA, 1985) (Note: From map: "The representation of international boundaries is not necessarily authoritative.")
