= Gulnisa Imin =

Uyghur poet and teacher)

- Born: 1976 (age 49–50)

Gulnisa Imin (Chinese: 依敏古丽尼沙; born 1976), also romanized as Gulnisa Emin, is a Chinese Uyghur poet and literature teacher from Xinjiang.

== Personal life ==
Imin is from Qira County in Hotan Prefecture, Xinjiang. She has children.

== Writing and detainment ==
Imin's work received attention on social media platforms WeChat and QQ. Her work, written in Uyghur, has been translated into Chinese and Japanese, and has been put to music.

In December 2015, Imin began her "One Thousand and One Nights" poetry project under the pseudonym "Gulhan".

Imin was detained multiple times beginning in 2014. She disappeared in March 2018, after night 345 of her "One Thousand and One Nights" project. In December 2021, Radio Free Asia reported that she had been sentenced to 17.5 years' imprisonment in China for spreading separatist sentiment. A Chinese government official confirmed to RFA that Imin was imprisoned at Mush Women’s prison in Tokkuzak (Toukezhake) township in Kashgar Prefecture.

Her work was included in the 2023 anthology Uyghur Poems (UK Everyman’s Library, an imprint of Penguin Random House) and the 2025 anthology Imprisoned Souls: Poems of Uyghur Prisoners in China (Hertfordshire Press), both edited by Aziz Isa Elkun. Her poetry was also included in the short documentary film Do You Know That I’m With You, created by Uyghur expatriate filmmaker Darya Andijan.
