= Gosthana (disambiguation) =

Gosthana may refer to:

- Gosthani River, a river located in southern India
- Hotan, also known as Gosthana, a city in Hotan Prefecture, Xinjiang, China
- Hotan County, also known as Gosthana County, a county in Hotan Prefecture, Xinjiang, China
- Hotan Prefecture, also known as Gosthana Prefecture. Located in Xinjiang, China
- Kingdom of Khotan, also known as the Kingdom of Gosthana which flourished in the first millennium CE
- Hotan River, also known as the Gosthana River, a river in north China.
- Yutian County, Xinjiang, county in Gosthana Prefecture (Hotan Prefecture), Xinjiang, China
