= Khotan (disambiguation) =

Khotan may refer to:

- Hotan, a city in Hotan Prefecture, Xinjiang, China
- Hotan County, a county in Hotan Prefecture, Xinjiang, China
- Hotan Prefecture, Xinjiang, China
- Kingdom of Khotan, which flourished in the first millennium CE
- Khotan Fernández, an actor commonly known simply as Khotan
- Yutian County, Xinjiang, a county in Xinjiang, China
