= Axel =

Axel may refer to:

== People ==
- Axel (name), all persons with the name

== Places ==
- Axel, Netherlands, a town
  - Capture of Axel, a battle at Axel in 1586

== Arts, entertainment, media ==
- Axel, a 1988 short film by Nigel Wingrove
- Axel, a Cirque du Soleil show
- Axël, an 1890 drama play by Auguste Villiers de l'Isle-Adam
- Axel (dance turn), a type of turn performed in dance
- Axel lift, a movement in pair skating
- Axel jump, a type of jump in figure skating
- "Axel F", the 1985 instrumental theme song of Beverly Hills Cop by Harold Faltermeyer

== Companies, organizations ==
- Axel Hotels, hotel chain
- Axel Springer SE, largest digital publishing house in Europe

== Other uses ==
- Axel Maersk, Danish container ship
- Citroën Axel, automobile made by Citroën
- Typhoon Axel (disambiguation), multiple storms named Axel
- Axel, a character in Pikwik Pack
- Axel, a coaxial two-wheeler, designed to investigate caves on the moon with the proposed mission Moon Diver (spacecraft)

== See also ==
- Aksel
- Axl (disambiguation)
- Axle, a central shaft for a rotating wheel or gear
