= AXI =

AXI or variation, may refer to:

- Automated X-ray inspection
- Advanced eXtensible Interface of ARM for Advanced Microcontroller Bus Architecture (AMBA)
- AXI car, a right-hand-drive version of the DMC DeLorean
- Aeron International Airlines (ICAO airline code: AXI), see List of airline codes (A)
- Axitinib (PDB code AXI)
- AxiCorp GmbH, a German pharmaceutical company, subsidiary of Biocon
- S55 Axi Expressway, see List of provincial expressways of China
- Axi (Chinese: 阿希村), Qaka, Xinjiang, China; a village
- Axi Township (Chinese: 阿西乡), Zoigê County, Ngawa, Sichuan, China; see List of township-level divisions of Sichuan
- Axi language, a Loloish language spoken by the Yi people
- Axi Stachowitsch (1918–2013), Austrian-Russian academic
- Robert Axi, 15th century Member of Parliament in England
- "axi-", a term pertaining to axis; see List of Greek and Latin roots in English/A–G

== See also ==
- Capsicum axi (C. axi), a species of chilli
- Trilobodrilus axi (T. axi), a species of bristleworm
- 1AXI, a protein configuration of Growth hormone 1
- 2AXI, a protein configuration of Mdm2
- Axi-cel, a treatment for large B-cell lymphoma
- Axi-Shield
- axis (disambiguation)
- Ax1 (disambiguation)
- Axl (disambiguation)
