= Hanerik =

Hanerik خانئېرىق بازىرى 罕艾日克镇 Han'airike
- Town
- Location in Xinjiang Hanerik (China)
- Coordinates: 37°13′27″N 79°47′47″E
- Country: China
- Autonomous Region: Xinjiang
- Prefecture: Hotan
- County: Hotan

Population (2010)
  - Total: 43,751

Ethnic groups
  - Major ethnic groups: Uyghur
- Time zone: UTC+8 (China Standard)

Hanerik (Uyghur: خانئېرىق بازىرى, romanized: Xan'ëriq baziri; Chinese: 罕艾日克镇, romanized: Hǎn'àirìkè zhèn), formerly Hanerik Township (Uyghur: خانئېرىق يېزىسى, romanized: Xan'ëriq yëzisi; Chinese: 罕艾日克乡, romanized: Hǎn'àirìkè xiāng), is a town in Hotan County, Hotan Prefecture, Xinjiang, China.

== History ==
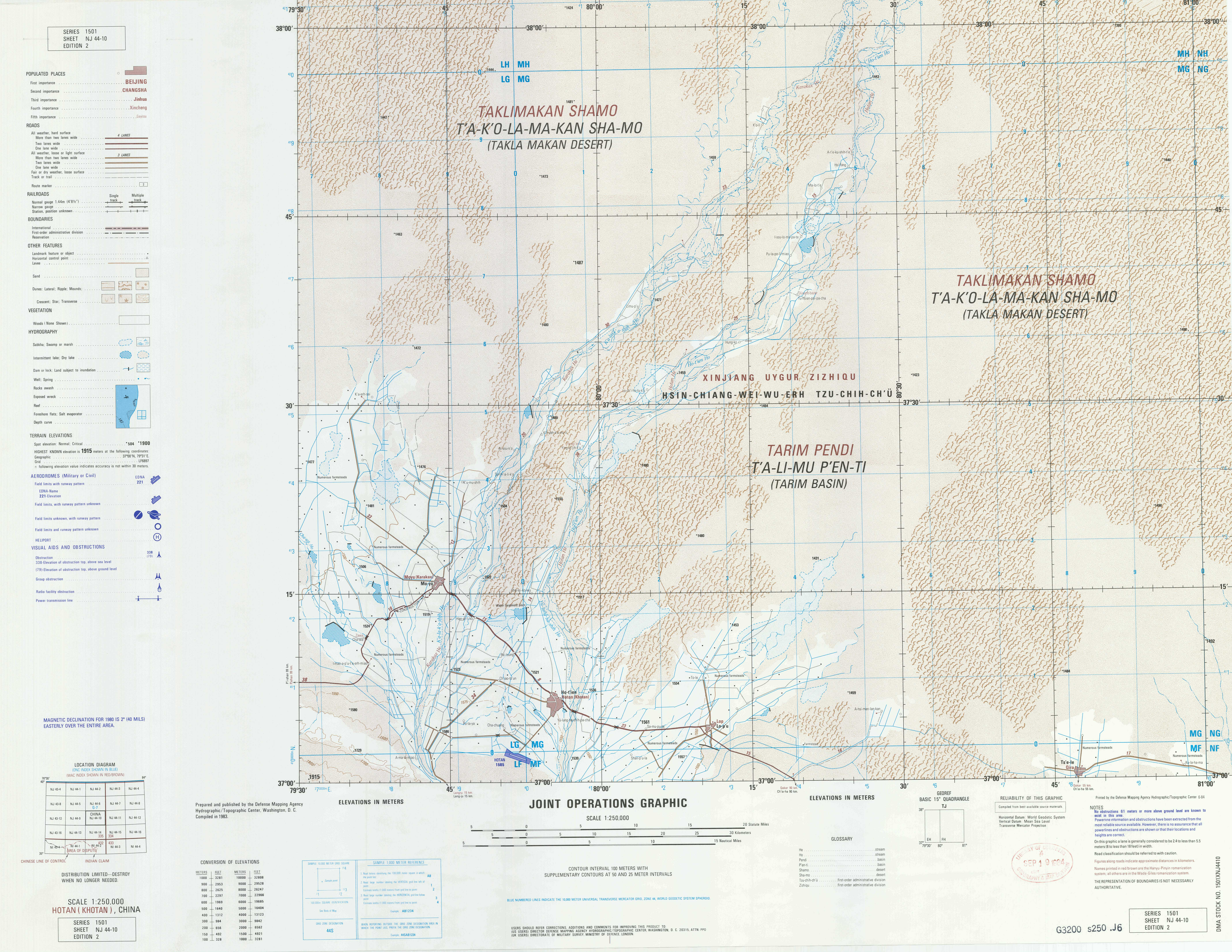

In 1984, Hanerik Township (罕艾日克乡) was established.

In 2012, Hanerik was changed from a township into a town.

On June 28, 2013, an incident involving Muslim protesters and local police in Hanerik occurred. Chinese state media said no one died during the confrontation. There were reports of protester deaths, as many as over 100.

== Administrative divisions ==
Hanerik includes one residential community and forty-one villages:

Residential community (Mandarin Chinese Hanyu Pinyin-derived names except where Uyghur is provided):

- Baihe (百合提社区)

Villages:

- Jigedai'airike (Jigedai Airikecun; 吉格代艾日克村), Kaleta (喀勒塔村), Youhao (友好村), Köl'ëriq (Kule'airike; كۆلئېرىق كەنتى / 库勒艾日克村), Tasimiqi (塔斯米其村), Wuqikunmaidan (乌其昆迈丹村), Bagewan (巴格万村), Balamasi (巴拉玛斯村), Youkurihan'airike (尤库日罕艾日克村), Qiang'ayimake (羌阿依玛克村), Tuowanhan'airike (托万罕艾日克村), Han'airike (罕艾日克村), Pa'erqi (帕尔其村), Youkakun (尤喀昆村), Arong (阿荣村), Bashituonu (巴什托奴村), Tuogayi (托尕依村), Qiaxianbaibazha (恰先拜巴扎村), Minhe (民和村), Xiamailai (夏买来村), Tuonu (托奴村), Hongxing (红星村), Layika (拉依喀村), Duxianbaibazha (都先拜巴扎村), Tiemu'erqi (铁木尔其村), Tayitake (塔依塔克村), Yurushikai (玉如什开村), Kezile'airike (克孜勒艾日克村), Kegezi'airike (克格孜艾日克村), Seriwei (色日维村), Qiaka'er (恰喀尔村), Bayimailai (巴依买来村), Kuma (库玛村), Bakale (巴喀勒村), Yingmailai (英买来村), Guzaile (古再勒村), Kuoke (阔克村), Wusitangboyi (吾斯塘博依村), Kuokeqi (阔克其村), Agemake (阿格玛克村), Ayagedun (阿亚格墩村)

== See also ==
- List of township-level divisions of Xinjiang
