= Qaka =

Qaka چاقا يېزىسى 恰哈乡 Qiaha, Chaqa, Ch'i-ko-erh, Ch'ia-ha
- Township
- Location in Xinjiang Qaka (China)
- Coordinates: 36°29′54″N 80°43′57″E
- Country: China
- Autonomous Region: Xinjiang
- Prefecture: Hotan
- County: Qira/Chira/Cele

Population (2010)
  - Total: 15,010

Ethnic groups
  - Major ethnic groups: Uyghur
- Time zone: UTC+8 (China Standard)

Qaka (چاقا يېزىسى / 恰哈乡) is a township in Qira County (Chira, Cele), Hotan Prefecture, Xinjiang, China.

== History ==
Qaka Township was established in 1984.

== Administrative divisions ==
Qaka includes twenty villages:

Villages (Mandarin Chinese Hanyu Pinyin-derived names except where Uyghur is provided):

- Querushi (Querushicun; 却如什村), Lenguy (Langui, Languicun; لەنگۇي كەنتى / 兰贵村), Serikeqiang (色日克羌村), Qiaha (恰哈村), Kexi (克希村), Kezikudigai (克孜库迪盖村), Duweilike (都维力克村), Andi'er (安迪尔村), Anba (安巴村), Ganjisayi (干吉萨依村), Kangtuokayi (康托喀依村), Axi (阿希村), Yuruketashi (玉如克塔什村), Asa (阿萨村), Ennilike (恩尼里克村), Kezileyaole (克孜勒尧勒村), Jiegetale (介格塔勒村), Wuku (乌库村), Kalatashi (喀拉塔什村), Hongqi (红旗村)

== See also ==
- List of township-level divisions of Xinjiang
