= Axl =

Axl may refer to:

== People ==
- Axl Rose, lead singer of Guns N' Roses
- Axl Rotten, ring name for former professional wrestler Brian Knighton (1971–2016)
- Axl Hazarika, an Indian musician
- Axl Beats, a British drill music producer

=== Fictional characters ===
- Axl Low, a character in the Guilty Gear video game series
- Axl Heck, a fictional character from the television sitcom, The Middle
- Axl (Mega Man X), a fictional character in the game series Mega Man X made by Capcom
- Axl (Nexo Knights), a character in Nexo Knights
- Axl, a character from Taz-Mania
- Axl Ambrose, a character from the 2022 TV series Firebuds

== Other ==
- AXL receptor tyrosine kinase in biochemistry, a member of the receptor tyrosine kinase family of cell surface receptors
- A.X.L., a 2018 American science fiction film featuring Becky G

== See also ==
- Axel (disambiguation)
- Axle
- AXI (disambiguation)
- ax1 (disambiguation)
