= Langru =

Langru لاڭرۇ يېزىسى 朗如乡 Lang-ju
- Township
- Location in Xinjiang Langru (China)
- Coordinates: 36°54′05″N 79°37′34″E
- Country: China
- Autonomous Region: Xinjiang
- Prefecture: Hotan
- County: Hotan

Population (2010)
  - Total: 16,505
- Time zone: UTC+8 (China Standard)

Langru (لاڭرۇ يېزىسى / 朗如乡) is a township in Hotan County, Hotan Prefecture, Xinjiang, China.

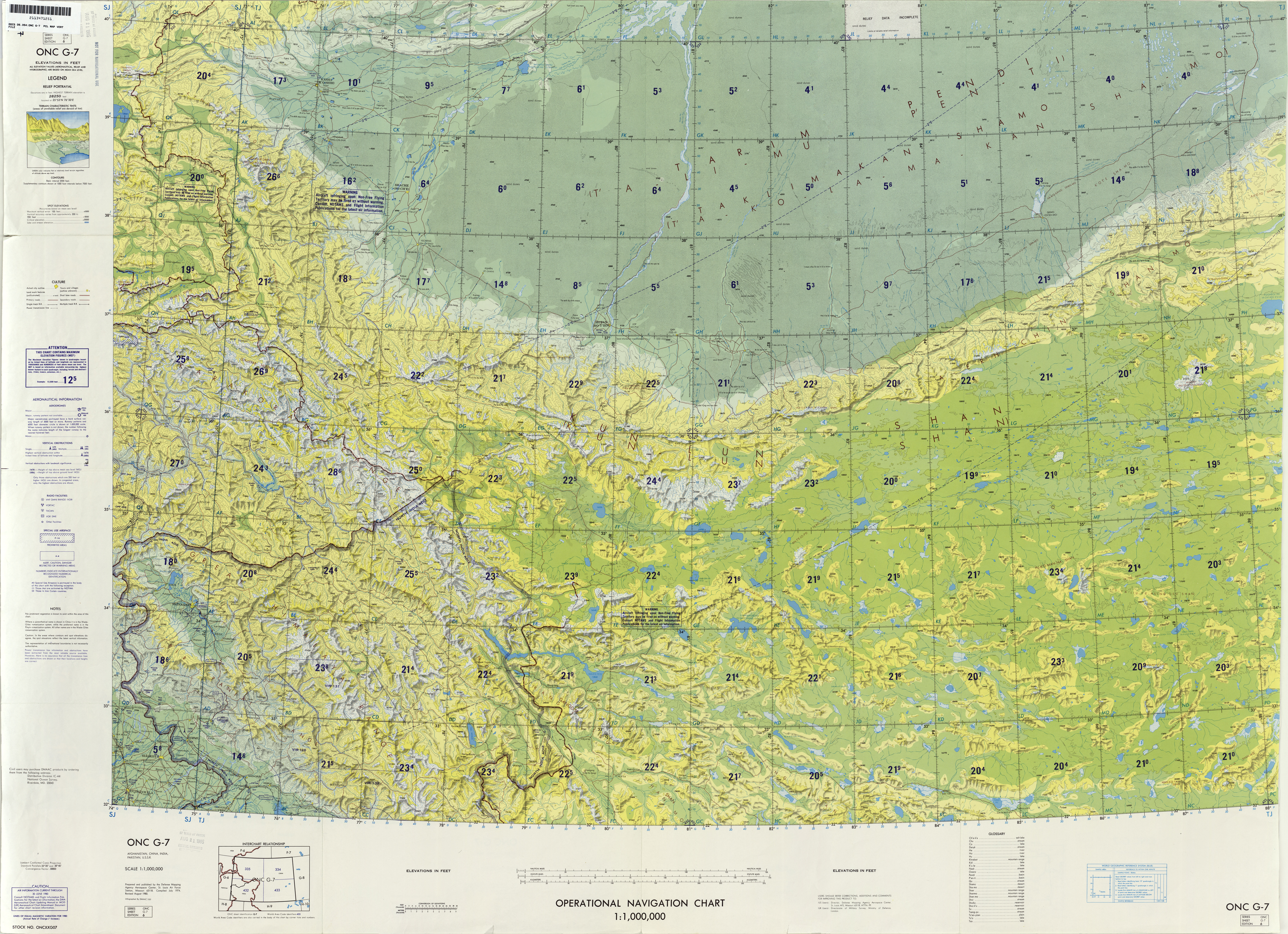
Map including Langru (Lang-ju) (DMA, 1980)

== History ==
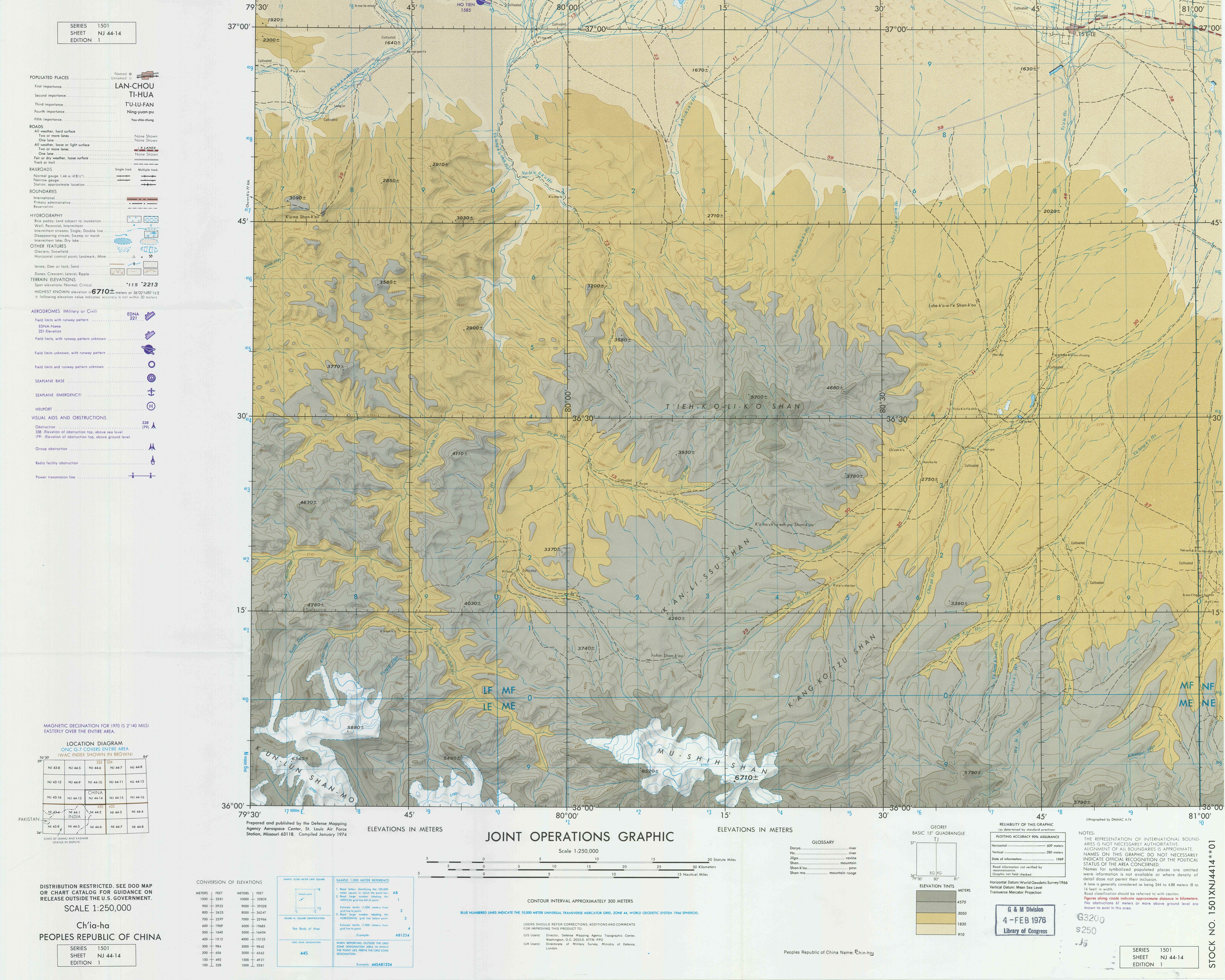

In 2014, according to one police document obtained by Radio Free Asia, any Uyghur on the police suspect list who failed to present himself or herself to authorities was to have their name "erased from township household registers".

== Administrative divisions ==
Langru includes fifteen villages:

Villages (Mandarin Chinese Hanyu Pinyin-derived names):

- Aotakesaiyi (奥塔克赛依村), Puji (Pujicun, Pujiya, P'u-chi-ya; 普吉村), Aigusai (艾古赛村), Popuna (迫普那村), Tatilikesu (塔提力克苏村), Daoziya (刀孜亚村), Langru (朗如村), Kuogaqibashi (阔尕其巴什村), Yafuqialike (亚甫恰力克村), Qiganlike (其干力克村), Paiziwati (排孜瓦提村), Nusui (奴遂村), Mitizi (米提孜村), Puxia (普夏村), Tiereke'aledi (铁热克阿勒迪村)

== See also ==
- List of township-level divisions of Xinjiang
