= Ax1 =

Ax1 or variation, may refer to:

- Honda AX-1, a motorcycle
- Roland AX-1, a keytar
- Axiom Mission 1 (AX-1), a space tourism mission to the International Space Station
- Accent Group, an Australia and New Zealand footwear and clothing company

== See also ==
- IEEE 802.1AX
- AXI (disambiguation)
- Axl (disambiguation)
- AX (disambiguation)
- 1 (disambiguation)
