= List of storms named Axel =

The name Axel has been used for two tropical cyclones in the Western Pacific Ocean.

- Severe Tropical Storm Axel (1992) (T9201, 01W), a Category 1 equivalent typhoon that caused heavy damage to several of the Marshall Islands
- Typhoon Axel (1994) (T9435, 38W, Garding), a Category 4 typhoon which passed over the central Philippines, killing at least 12 people
