= Qira County =

Qira County چىرا ناھىيىسى (Uyghur) 策勒县 (Chinese) Chira, Cele, Ts'e-le
- County
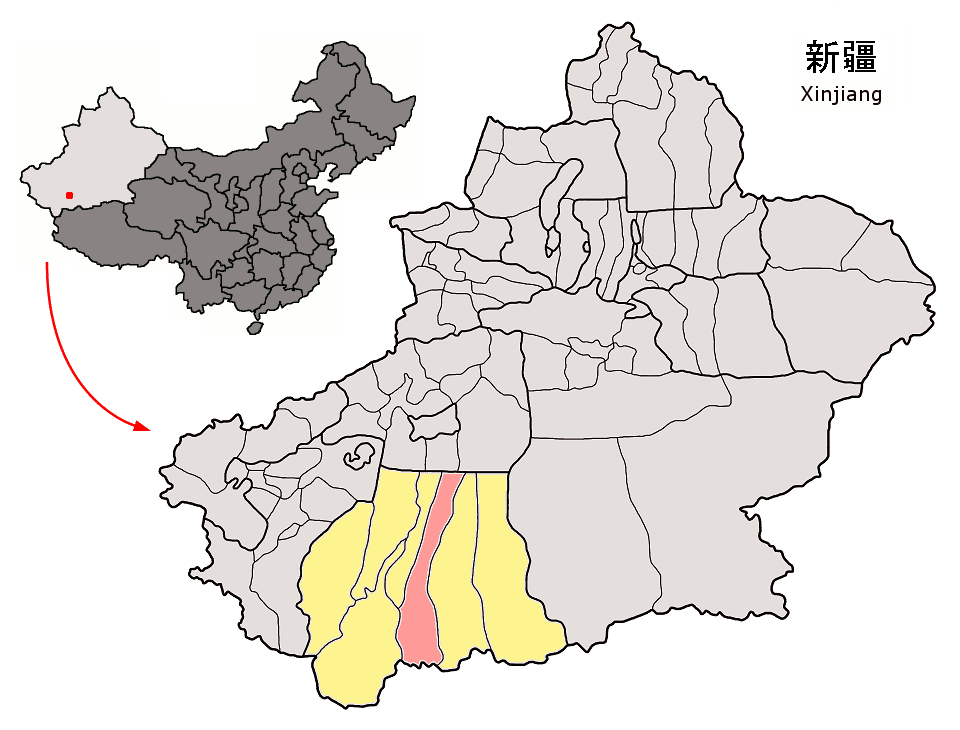
- Location of the county in Hotan Prefecture (yellow) and Xinjiang

- Location of the seat in Xinjiang Qira (Xinjiang) Qira (China)
- Coordinates: 37°00′N 80°48′E
- Country: China
- Autonomous region: Xinjiang
- Prefecture: Hotan
- County seat: Qira Town
- Township-level divisions: 2 towns, 6 townships

Area
  - Total: 31,688.01 km^{2} (12,234.81 sq mi)
- Elevation: 1,500–7,282 m (4,921–23,891 ft)

Population (2020)
  - Total: 157,792
  - Density: 4.97955/km^{2} (12.8970/sq mi)

Ethnic groups
  - Major ethnic groups: Uyghur
- Time zone: UTC+8 (China Standard (Note: Locals in Xinjiang frequently observe UTC+6 (Xinjiang Time), 2 hours behind Beijing.))
- Postal code: 848300
- Website: xjcl.gov.cn (in Chinese)

Qira County

Uyghur name
- Uyghur: چىرا ناھىيىسى
Transcriptions
- Latin Yëziqi: Chira Nahiyisi
- Yengi Yeziⱪ: Qira Naⱨiyisi
- SASM/GNC: Qira Nahiyisi
- Siril Yëziqi: Чира Наһийиси

Chinese name
- Simplified Chinese: 策勒县
- Traditional Chinese: 策勒縣
Transcriptions
Standard Mandarin
- Hanyu Pinyin: Cèlè Xiàn
- Wade–Giles: Tsʻê⁴-lê⁴ Hsien⁴

Qira County (Uyghur: چىرا ناھىيىسى), alternatively Chira or Cele (from Mandarin Chinese), is a county in Hotan Prefecture, Xinjiang Uyghur Autonomous Region, China. Almost all the residents of the county are Uyghurs and live around oases situated between the desolate Taklamakan Desert and Kunlun Mountains. The county is bordered to the north by Aksu Prefecture, to the east by Yutian / Keriya County, to the northwest by Lop County, to the southwest by Hotan County including the China-India disputed Aksai Chin area and to the south by Rutog County, Ngari Prefecture in Tibet.

== History ==
The sixth century Dandan Oilik oasis town archaeological site where Buddhist shrines and texts were discovered is located in the desert of northern Qira (Chira) County.

Qira town (Chira), the town that is the current county seat of Qira County, has been forced to change locations on three occasions due to encroachment by the sands of the Taklamakan Desert.

In his 1900-01 expedition in the region, Aurel Stein travelled across the northern section of today's Qira County, a section of the Taklamakan Desert between today's Lop County and the Keriya River. There were several wells along the course he took.

Qira County was divided from Yutian / Keriya County in 1928/9.

In the thirty years between the 1950s and 1980s, a significant area of farmland near the county seat was taken into the desert by blown sand.

Since the founding of Xinjiang Autonomous Region in 1955, Qira County has been part of Hotan Prefecture.

In the 1980s, 446 households living in the county seat were forced to relocate due to the effects of desertification which had brought the Taklamakan Desert within 1.5 kilometres (0.93 mi) km of their homes, sometimes burying homes in sand overnight.

"When I woke up one morning, I found I couldn't open the door because of the weight of sand that had accumulated overnight. My crops were buried too, so I had no choice but to move" -Memet Simay, area resident

In 1983, the Qira research station of the Chinese Academy of Sciences was founded to combat drift sand. A transitional zone was established with help from the scientists at the station, and the sands were pushed back over 5 kilometres (3.1 mi).

In 2005, a small 1,500 year-old Buddhist temple was discovered 7 km (4.3 mi) from Damiku (Damagou).

On October 20, 2014, Damiku (Damagou) was changed from a township to a town.

On January 7, 2016, areas near Nur, Bostan and Ulughsay townships in Qira County were made part of the newly created Kunyu.

On February 28, 2017, it was announced by the county government that those who reported others for stitching the 'star and crescent moon' insignia on their clothing or personal items or having the words 'East Turkestan' on their mobile phone case, purse or other jewelry, would be eligible for cash payments.

In March 2017, Salamet Memetimin, the Communist Party secretary for Chaka township's Bekchan village and ethnic Uyghur, was relieved of her duties for taking her nikah marriage vows at her home. According to the Hotan Daily, 97 officials were charged with disciplinary violations at this time.

In 2018, local government authorities in the county expected to have almost 12,000 detainees in vocational camps and detention centres and some projects related to the centres outstripped budgetary limits.

According to the Chinese Government, by the end of 2018, construction of Jinnan New Village (津南新村) in Qira Town (Cele) was completed. To increase aid delivery to Xinjiang, places in Xinjiang are paired with other areas of China which can provide aid. Tianjin and Hotan are paired in this program. Through assistance from the Tianjin government, a standard football field and training center was constructed at the No. 1 Primary School in the county.

== Geography ==
The northern part of Qira County is made up of sand dunes and ends in a straight line drawn in the Taklamakan Desert that forms part of the boundary between Hotan Prefecture and Aksu Prefecture. The area is between 1,500 m (4,900 ft) and 1,800 m (5,900 ft) above sea level.

Oasis areas occupy 2.9% of the total area of the county. The oasis areas along China National Highway 315 include the Qira County county seat area, Gulahma and Damiku. Qaka, Ulughsay, Nur, Bostan and Kunyu's small exclaves in Qira County are located close to the Kunlun Mountains.

The southern part of Qira County is mountainous with an average elevation of 3,200 m (10,500 ft) above sea level. The upper reaches of the White Jade River (Yurung Kash), which provide water for Hotan (Khotan), are found in the Kunlun Mountains of southern Qira County. Mountain passes in the area include Mandar Kol Dawan, Shalgon Dawan, Kuchkash Bulak Dawan, and Art Dawan. One of the prominent mountains in the county is Muztag (K5, Wu-lu-ko Ho Shan, Mo-shih Shan, Mu-shih Shan, Muztagh Jilga; 慕士山, 木斯山) which is 7,282 m (23,891 ft) above sea level. The meltwater from this mountain creates the Qira River (Cele River, Ts'e-lo Ho; 策勒河) which flows through Qaka into the Qira county seat.

In the mid-20th century, camping grounds in the sparsely populated southern mountainous area of the county included Chotma, Yangi kan, Zaiuk, Yaskako Tagh, Mandar Chap, and Chumik.

== Climate ==
Climate data for Qira, elevation 1,337 m (4,386 ft), (1991–2020 normals, extremes 1981–2010)
Month	Jan	Feb	Mar	Apr	May	Jun	Jul	Aug	Sep	Oct	Nov	Dec	Year
Record high °C (°F)	20.0 (68.0)	23.7 (74.7)	32.3 (90.1)	36.9 (98.4)	38.0 (100.4)	40.5 (104.9)	42.0 (107.6)	40.9 (105.6)	36.8 (98.2)	32.1 (89.8)	25.1 (77.2)	19.6 (67.3)	42.0 (107.6)
Mean daily maximum °C (°F)	1.8 (35.2)	8.0 (46.4)	17.4 (63.3)	25.0 (77.0)	29.1 (84.4)	32.1 (89.8)	33.7 (92.7)	32.5 (90.5)	28.5 (83.3)	21.8 (71.2)	12.6 (54.7)	3.9 (39.0)	20.5 (69.0)
Daily mean °C (°F)	−4.4 (24.1)	1.5 (34.7)	10.4 (50.7)	17.4 (63.3)	21.5 (70.7)	24.7 (76.5)	26.1 (79.0)	24.9 (76.8)	20.4 (68.7)	12.6 (54.7)	4.6 (40.3)	−2.5 (27.5)	13.1 (55.6)
Mean daily minimum °C (°F)	−9.5 (14.9)	−4.4 (24.1)	3.6 (38.5)	10.2 (50.4)	14.5 (58.1)	18.1 (64.6)	19.8 (67.6)	18.7 (65.7)	13.5 (56.3)	5.1 (41.2)	−1.6 (29.1)	−7.4 (18.7)	6.7 (44.1)
Record low °C (°F)	−21.8 (−7.2)	−20.7 (−5.3)	−9.3 (15.3)	−0.7 (30.7)	2.6 (36.7)	8.0 (46.4)	11.5 (52.7)	7.4 (45.3)	1.9 (35.4)	−4.7 (23.5)	−13.7 (7.3)	−20.5 (−4.9)	−21.8 (−7.2)
Average precipitation mm (inches)	1.3 (0.05)	1.5 (0.06)	2.3 (0.09)	4.8 (0.19)	8.4 (0.33)	10.5 (0.41)	7.7 (0.30)	3.7 (0.15)	6.9 (0.27)	0.5 (0.02)	0.5 (0.02)	0.7 (0.03)	48.8 (1.92)
Average precipitation days (≥ 0.1 mm)	1.9	1.3	0.6	1.3	1.9	3.6	2.9	1.8	1.0	0.3	0.3	1.3	18.2
Average snowy days	4.5	2.2	0.5	0	0	0	0	0	0	0	0.5	3.0	10.7
Average relative humidity (%)	52	41	28	27	32	38	42	44	44	42	43	52	40
Mean monthly sunshine hours	180.4	180.9	202.3	223.7	260.5	257.4	246.6	233.9	237.8	258.1	216.7	185.0	2,683.3
Percentage possible sunshine	58	58	54	56	59	59	56	57	65	76	72	62	61
Source: China Meteorological Administration

== Administrative divisions ==
Qira County includes two towns and six townships:

Name	Simplified Chinese	Hanyu Pinyin	Uyghur (UEY)	Uyghur Latin (ULY)	Administrative division code	Notes
Towns
Qira Town	策勒镇	Cèlè Zhèn	چىرا بازىرى	chira baziri	653225100	
Gulahma Town	固拉合玛镇	Gùlāhémǎ Zhèn	گۇلاخما بازىرى	gulaxma baziri	653225102	formerly Gulahma Township (固拉合玛乡)
Townships
Qira Township	策勒乡	Cèlè Xiāng	چىرا يېزىسى	chira yëzisi	653225200	
Damiku Township (Dumuka)	达玛沟乡	Dámǎgōu Xiāng	دامىكۇ يېزىسى	damiku yëzisi	653225202	
Qaka Township	恰哈乡	Qiàhā Xiāng	چاقا يېزىسى	chaqa yëzisi	653225203	
Ulughsay Township	乌鲁克萨依乡	Wūlǔkèsàyī Xiāng	ئۇلۇغساي يېزىسى	Ulughsay yëzisi	653225204	
Nur Township	奴尔乡	Nú'ěr Xiāng	نۇرى يېزىسى	nuri yëzisi	653225205	
Bostan Township	博斯坦乡	Bósītǎn Xiāng	بوستان يېزىسى	bostan yëzisi	653225206	

== Economy ==
Agricultural products of the county include wheat, corn, cotton, petroleum products, melons, pomegranates, walnuts, peaches, and apricots. Livestock raised in the county include horses, cows and sheep. Industry in the country includes electronics, construction, cotton ginning and food processing (fruits).

== Demographics ==
Historical population
Year	Pop.	±% p.a.
2000	132,139	—
2010	147,050	+1.07%
2015	166,735	+2.54%

As of 2015, 163,705 of the 166,735 residents of the county were Uyghur, 2,921 were Han Chinese and 109 were from other ethnic groups.

As of the 2010s, the population of Qira County was more than 98% Uyghur.

As of 1999, 98.45% of the population of Qira (Cele) County was Uyghur and 1.51% of the population was Han Chinese.

== Transportation ==
- China National Highway 315 runs through the Qira County county seat, Gulahma and Damiku.
- Qira Railway Station is served by Hotan–Ruoqiang railway.

== Notable persons ==
- Ismail Amat, former Chairman (Governor) of Xinjiang

== Gallery ==
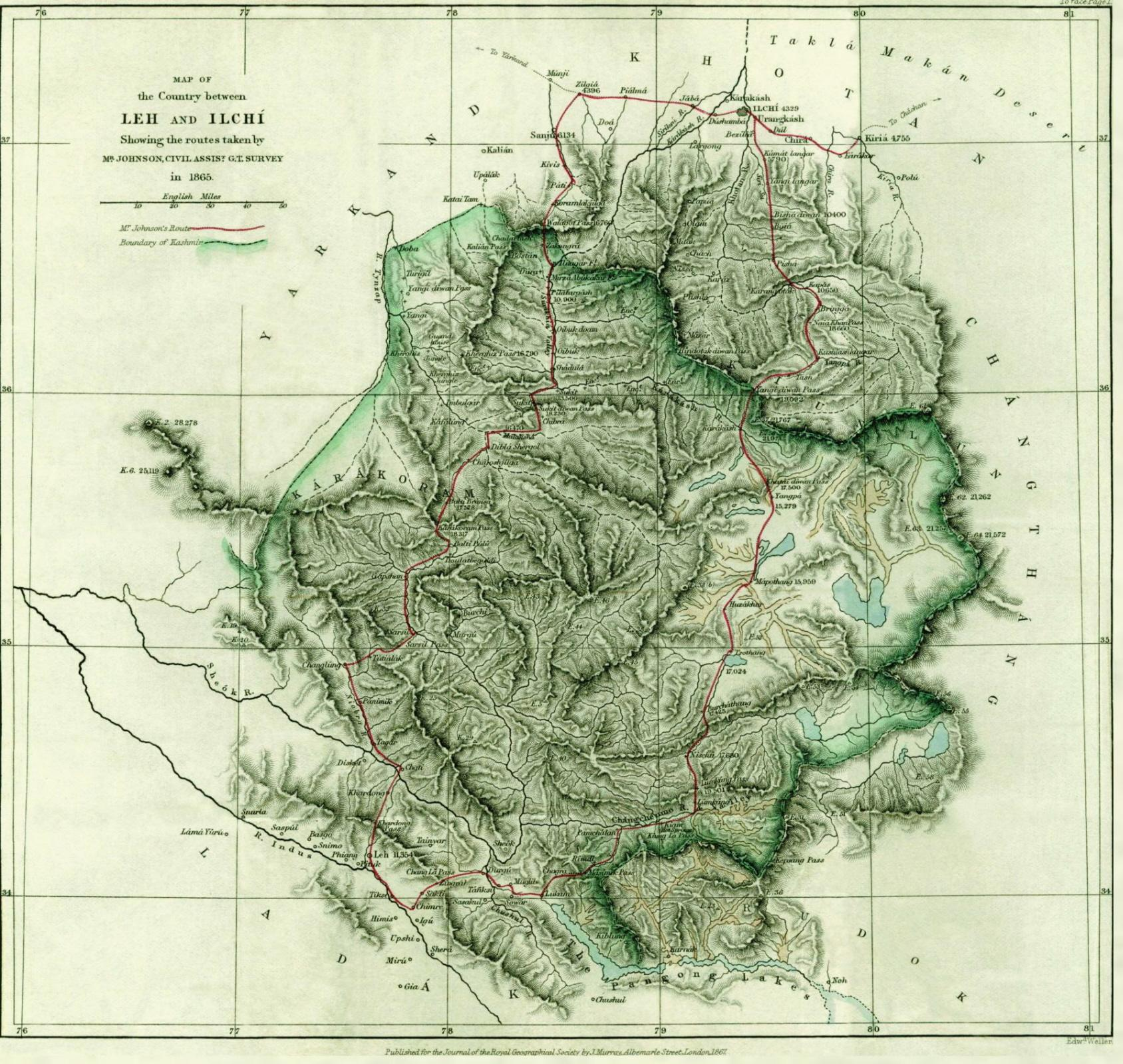
Map including Chira (1865)

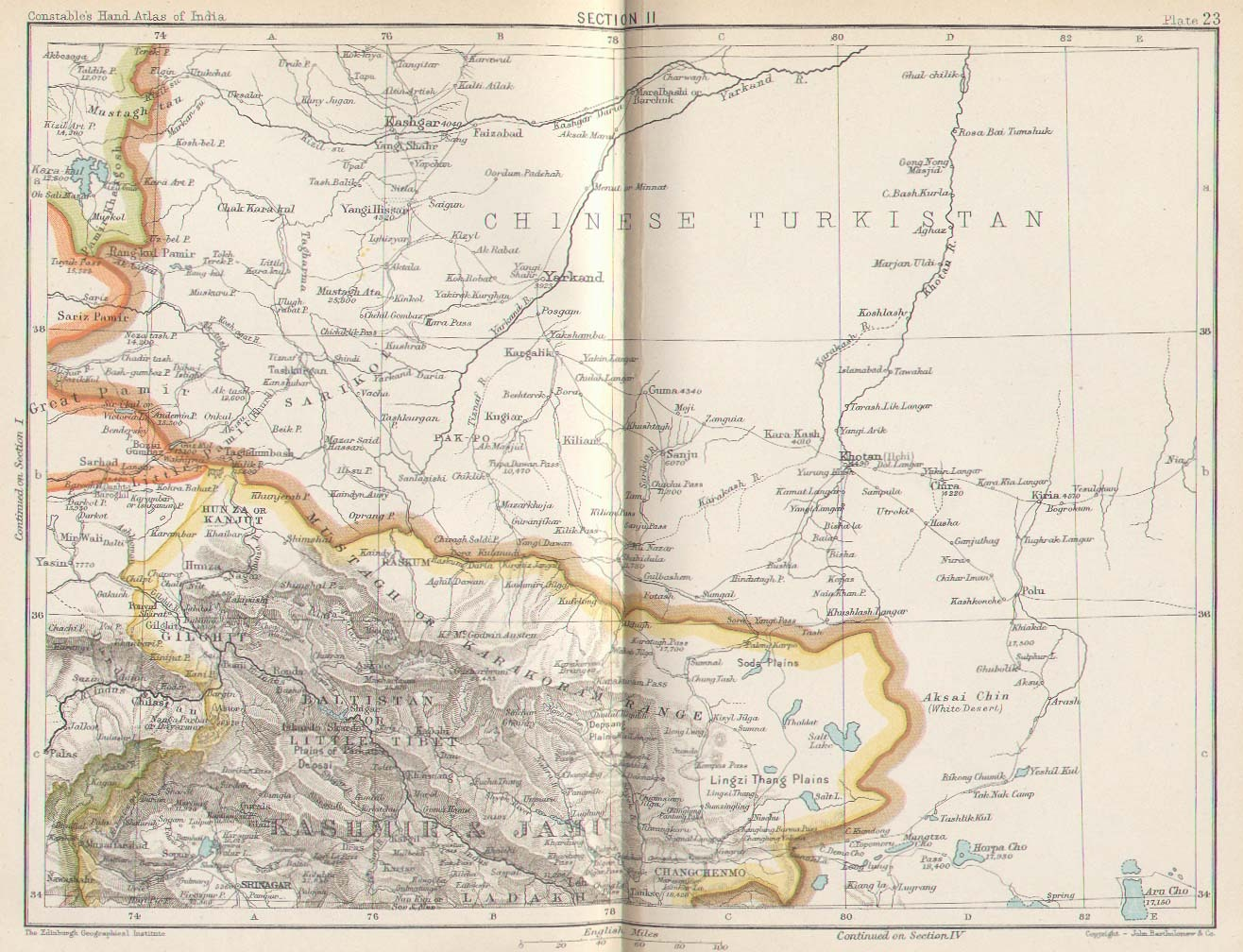
Map of the region including Chira (1893)

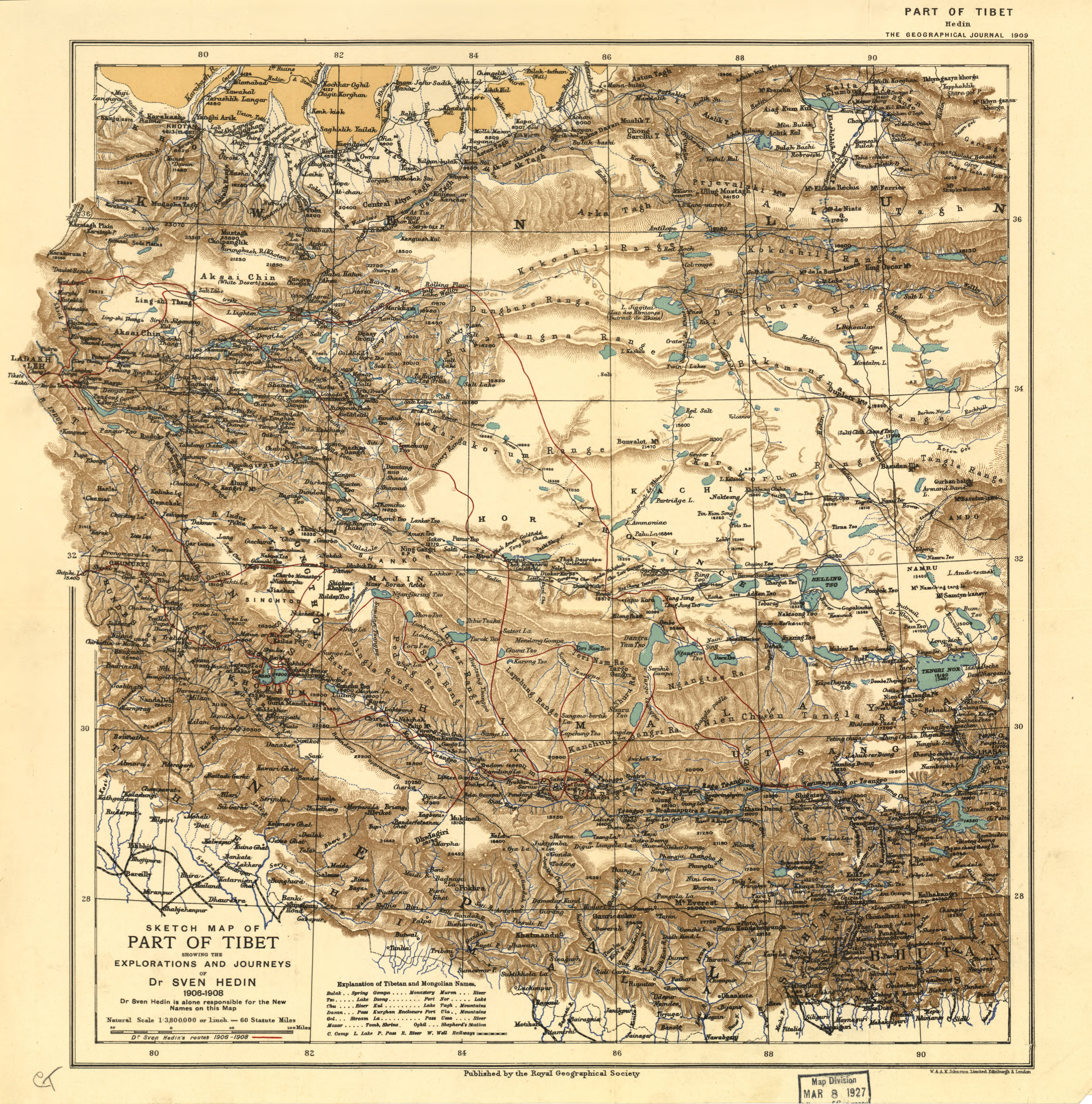
Map of the expeditions of Sven Hedin (1906-8) including Qira (labeled as Chira) (RGS, early 20th century)

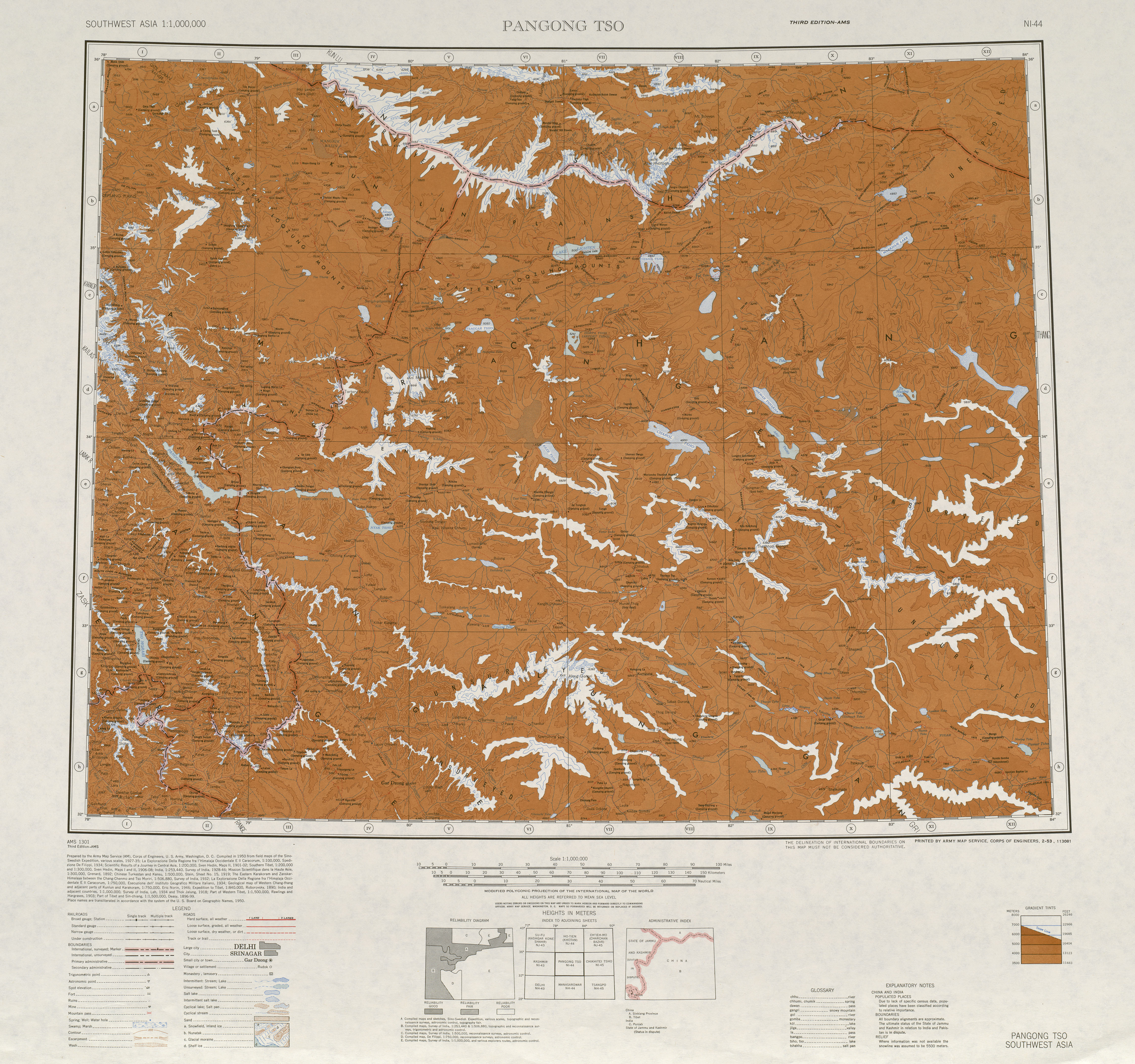
Map including the southern part of Qira County and the county's border with Tibet (AMS, 1950) (Note: From map: "THE DELINEATION OF INTERNATIONAL BOUNDARIES ON THIS MAP MUST NOT BE CONSIDERED AUTHORITATIVE.")

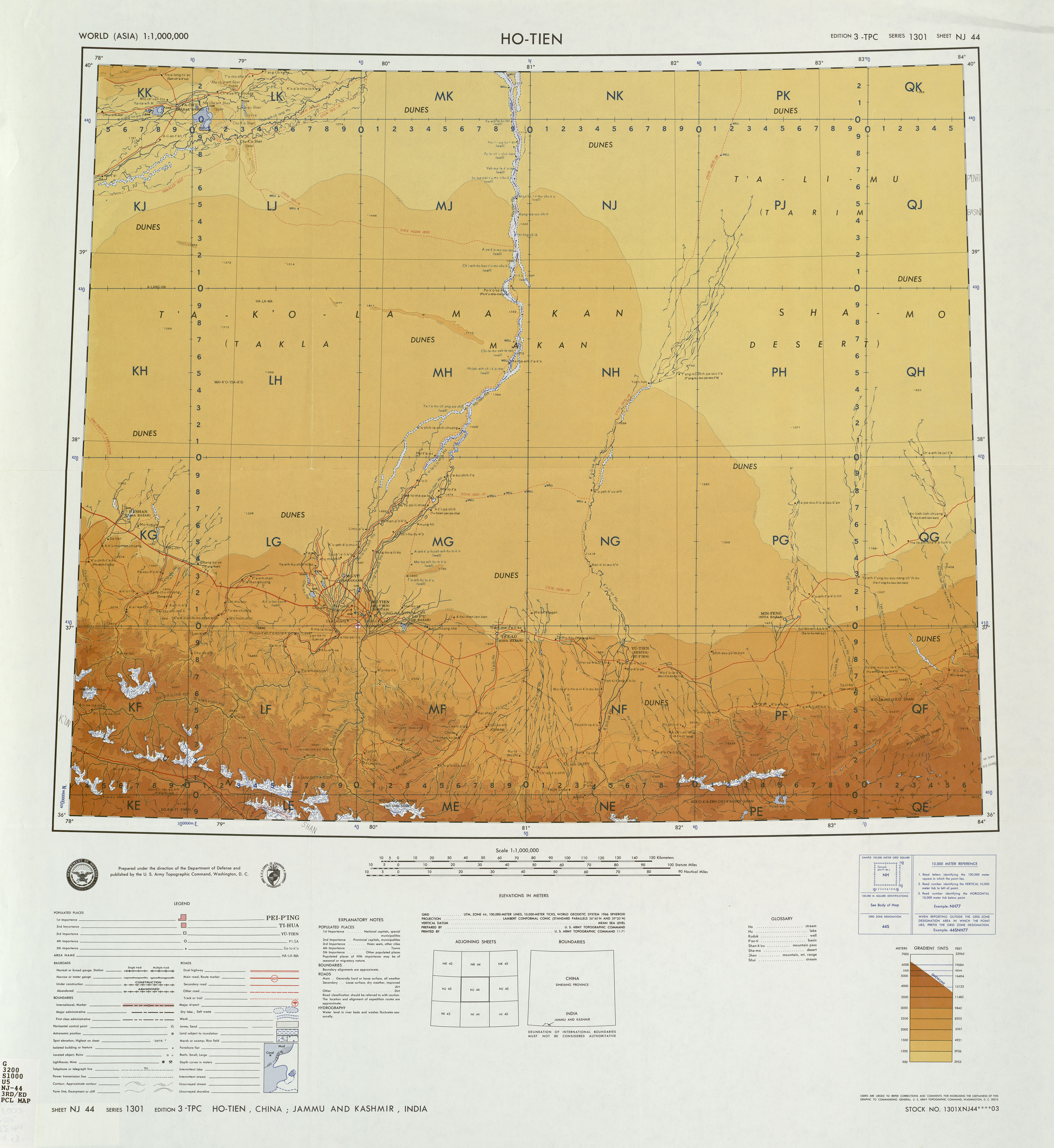
Map including Qira (labeled as TS'E-LO (CHIRA BAZAR)) and surrounding region (USATC, 1971) (Note: From map: "DELINEATION OF INTERNATIONAL BOUNDARIES MUST NOT BE CONSIDERED AUTHORITATIVE".)

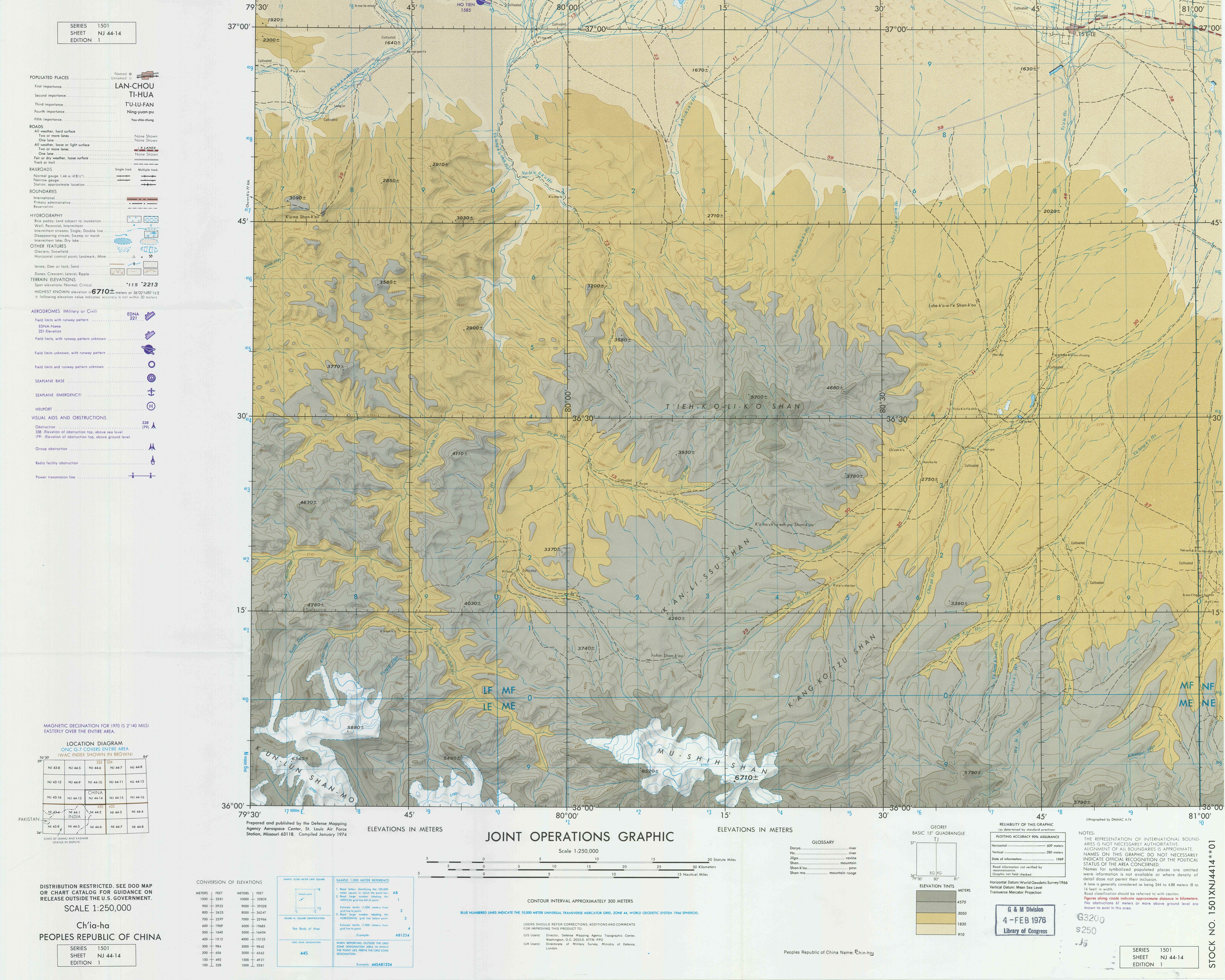
Map including Qira (labeled as TS'E-LE) (DMA, 1974)

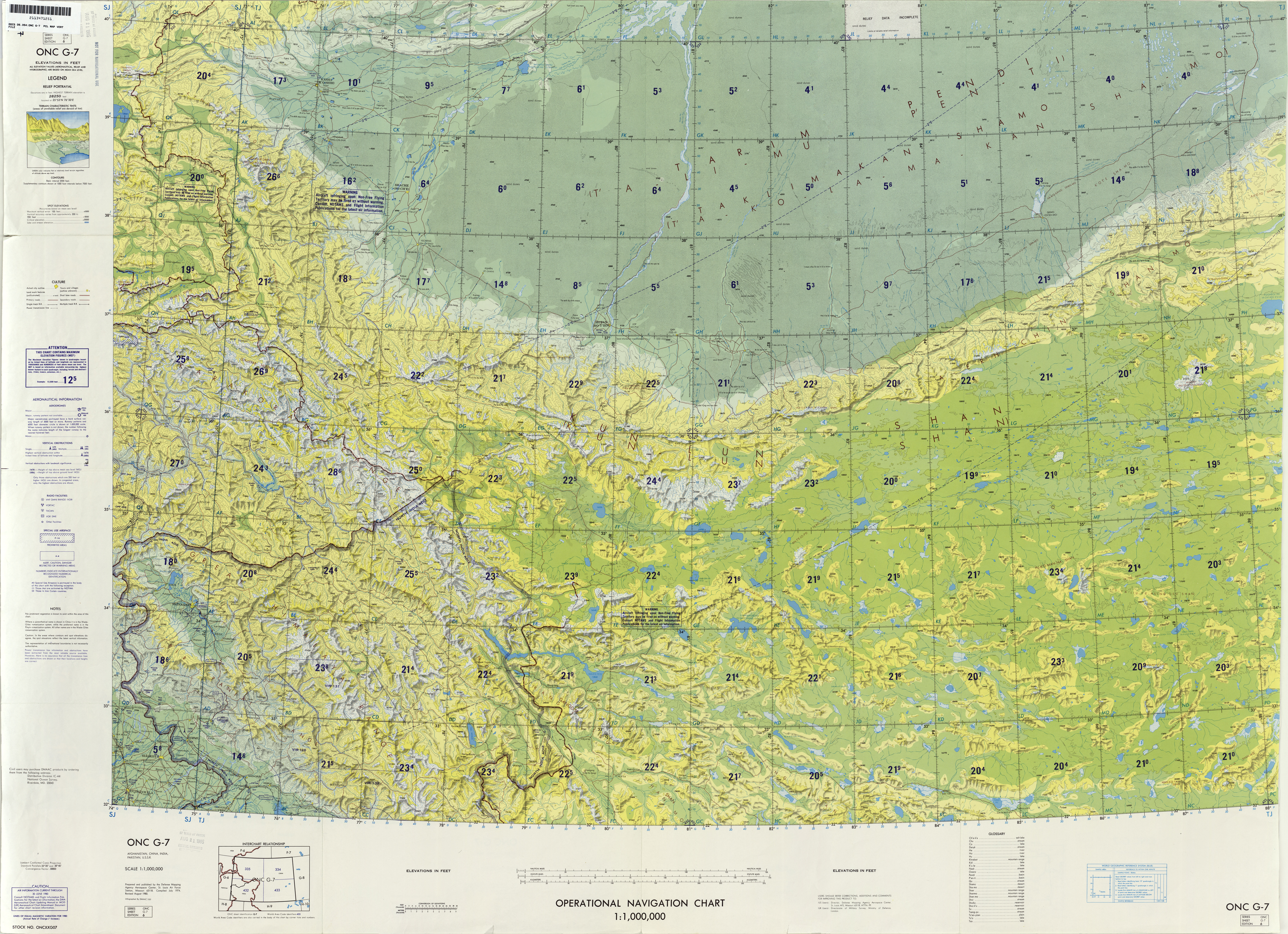
From the Operational Navigation Chart; map including Qira (labeled as QIRA (TS'E-LE)) (DMA, 1980) (Note: From map: "The representation of international boundaries is not necessarily authoritative.")

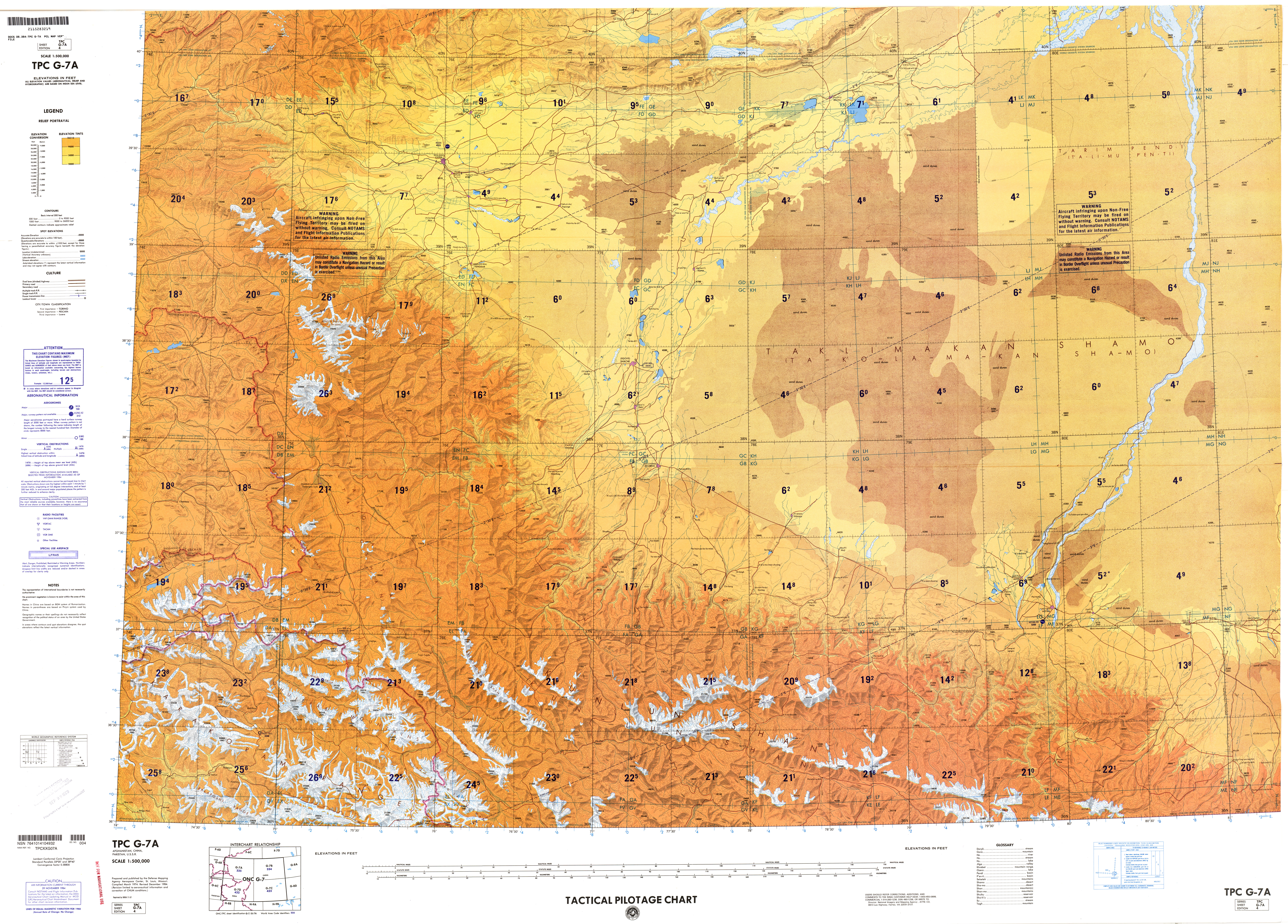
Map including Qira (labeled as QIRA (TS'E-LE)) (DMA, 1984) (Note: From map: "The representation of international boundaries is not necessarily authoritative")

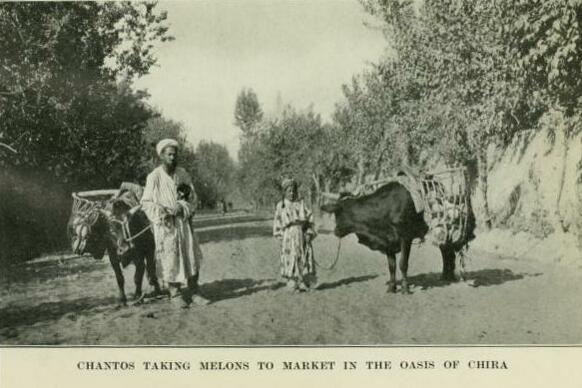
Traders in early 20th century Qira (Chira)

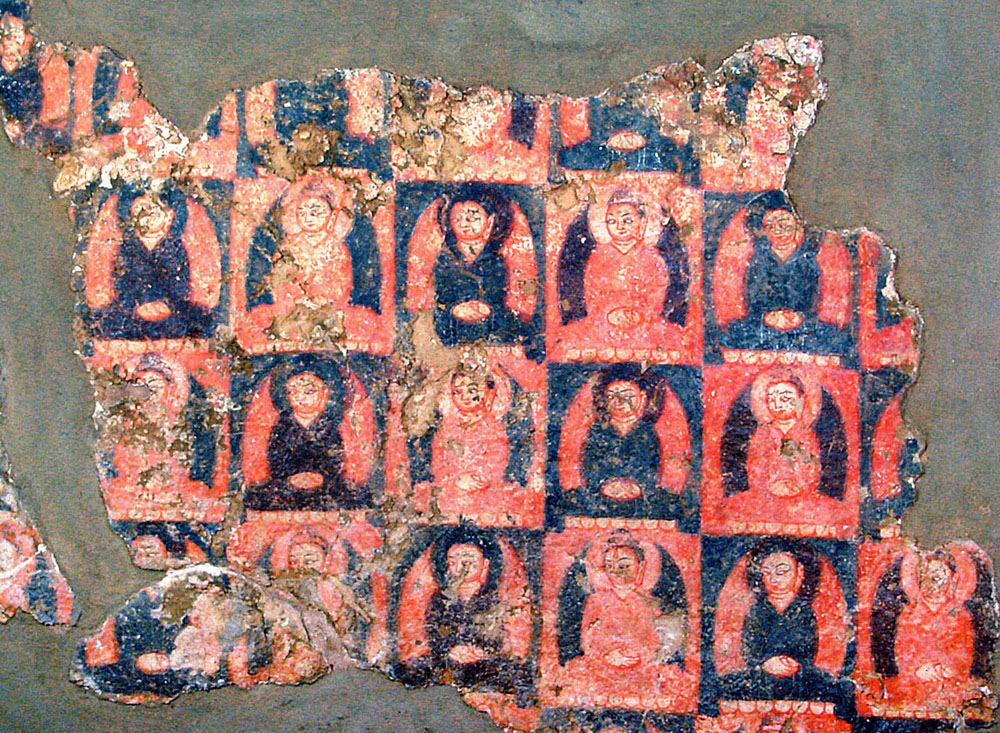
Buddhist Mural from Dandan Oilik
