= Hotan County =

Hotan County: خوتەن ناھىيىسى (Uyghur); 和田县 (Chinese); Gosthana, Gaustana, Khotan, Hotien
- County
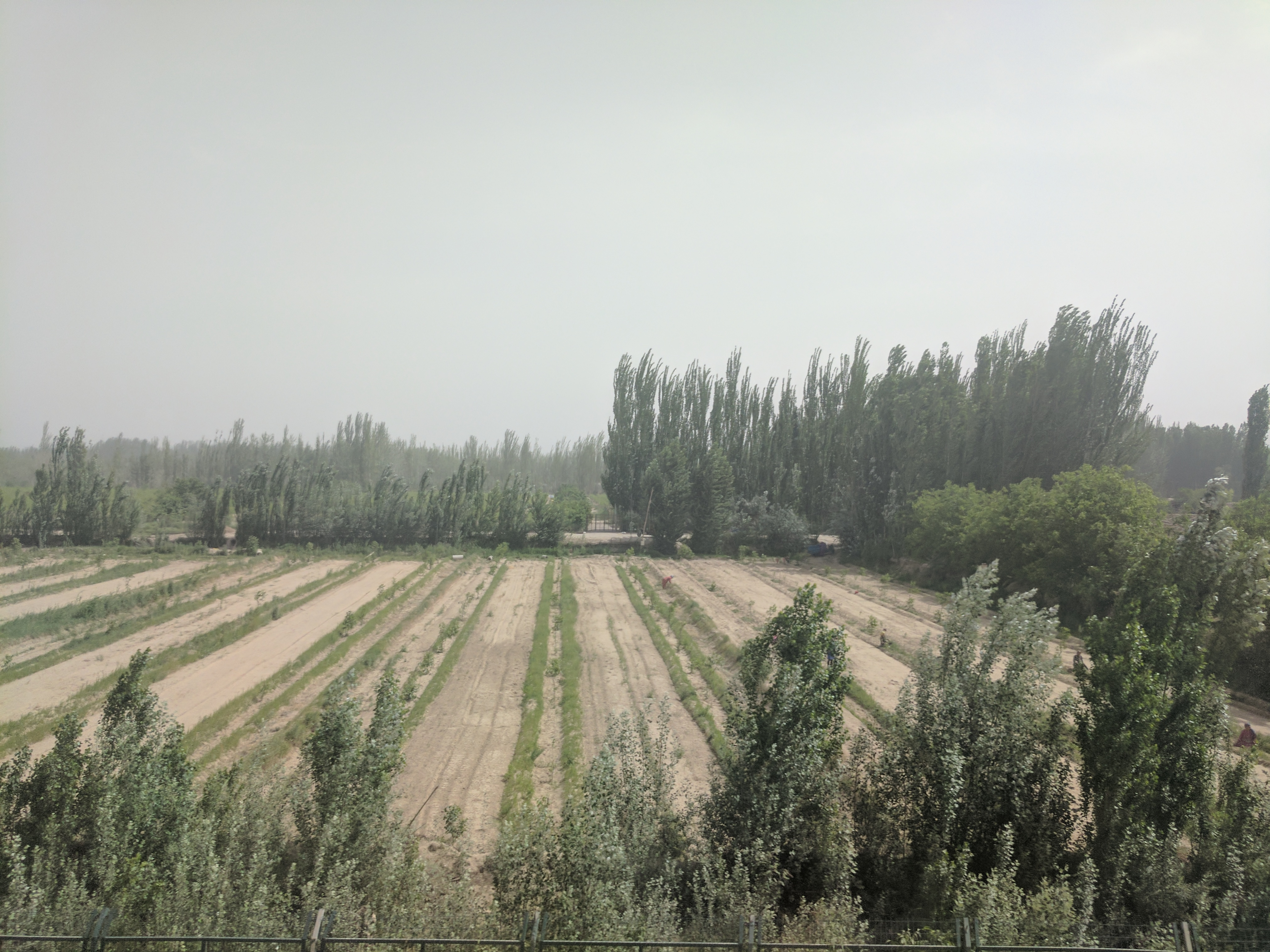
- Farmland near Hotan City

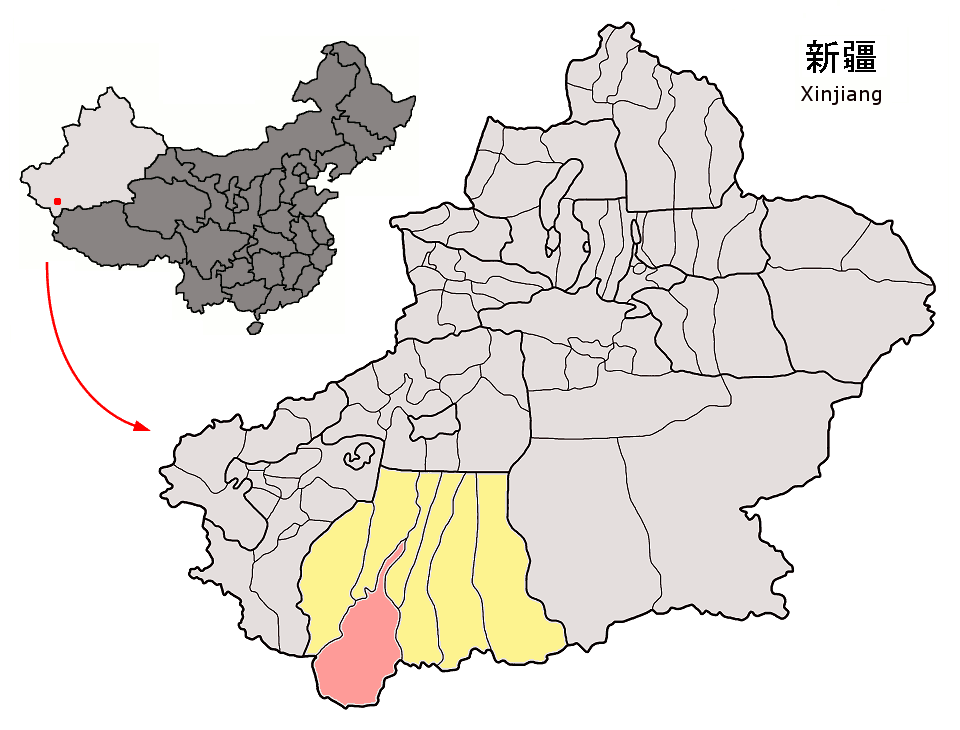
- Location of Hotan County (red) in Hotan Prefecture (yellow) and Xinjiang

- Location within Southern Xinjiang Location within Xinjiang Location within China
- Coordinates: 37°05′26″N 79°49′44″E
- Country: China
- Autonomous region: Xinjiang
- Prefecture: Hotan
- County seat: Gujanbagh Subdistrict, Hotan City (Note: The government seat of Hotan County is located at Gujanbagh Subdistrict, Hotan City.)

Area (claimed) (Note: includes the Sino-Indian disputed areas in Aksai Chin.)
  - Total: 41,128 km^{2} (15,880 sq mi)

Population (2020)
  - Total: 342,603
  - Density: 8.3302/km^{2} (21.575/sq mi)

Ethnic groups
  - Major ethnic groups: Uyghur
- Time zone: UTC+8 (China Standard (Note: Locals in Xinjiang frequently observe UTC+6 (Xinjiang Time), 2 hours behind Beijing.))
- Website: htx.gov.cn (in Chinese)

Hotan County

Uyghur name
- Uyghur: خوتەن ناھىيىسى
Transcriptions
- Latin Yëziqi: Xoten Nahiyisi
- Yengi Yeziⱪ: Hotən Naⱨiyisi
- SASM/GNC: Hotän Naĥiyisi
- Siril Yëziqi: Хотән Наһийиси

Chinese name
- Simplified Chinese: 和田县
- Traditional Chinese: 和田縣
Transcriptions
Standard Mandarin
- Hanyu Pinyin: Hétián Xiàn
- Bopomofo: ㄏㄜˊ ㄊㄧㄢˊ ㄒㄧㄢˋ
- Gwoyeu Romatzyh: Hertyan Shiann
- Wade–Giles: Ho²-tʻien² Hsien⁴
- IPA: [xɤ̌.tʰjɛ̌n ɕjɛ̂n]

Alternative Chinese name
- Simplified Chinese: 和阗县
- Traditional Chinese: 和闐縣
Transcriptions
Standard Mandarin
- Hanyu Pinyin: Hétián Xiàn
- Bopomofo: ㄏㄜˊ ㄊㄧㄢˊ ㄒㄧㄢˋ
- Gwoyeu Romatzyh: Hertyan Shiann
- Wade–Giles: Ho²-tʻien² Hsien⁴
- IPA: [xɤ̌.tʰjɛ̌n ɕjɛ̂n]

Second alternative Chinese name
- Simplified Chinese: 于窴县
- Traditional Chinese: 于窴縣
Transcriptions
Standard Mandarin
- Hanyu Pinyin: Yútián Xiàn
- Bopomofo: ㄩˊ ㄊㄧㄢˊ ㄒㄧㄢˋ
- Gwoyeu Romatzyh: Yutyan Shiann
- Wade–Giles: Yü²-tʻien² Hsien⁴
- IPA: [y̌.tʰjɛ̌n ɕjɛ̂n]

Hotan County (also known as Gosthana, Gaustana, Godana, Godaniya, Khotan, Hetian, and Hotien) is a county in the southwest of the Xinjiang Uyghur Autonomous Region and is under the administration of the Hotan Prefecture. Almost all residents of the county are Uyghurs and live around oases situated between the desolate Taklamakan Desert and the Kunlun Mountains. Hotan County is the southernmost county-level division of Xinjiang. The county borders Karakax / Moyu County to the northwest, Hotan City and Lop County to the northeast, Qira County to the east, Pishan County to the west, and (in Aksai Chin) Rutog County, Tibet to the southeast. Hotan County administers most of Aksai Chin, an area disputed between China and India. The Line of Actual Control divides the India-controlled part of Ladakh union territory from the Aksai Chin area administered as part of southwest Hotan County.

== Name ==
The area of Hotan is originally known as and has been historically referred to as Godana (Godaniya), a Sanskrit name meaning "Land of the cows". In Chinese, the same name is written as Yu-t'ien. It is referred to as Gosthana by local Tibetans, which also means the same in Sanskrit.

== History ==
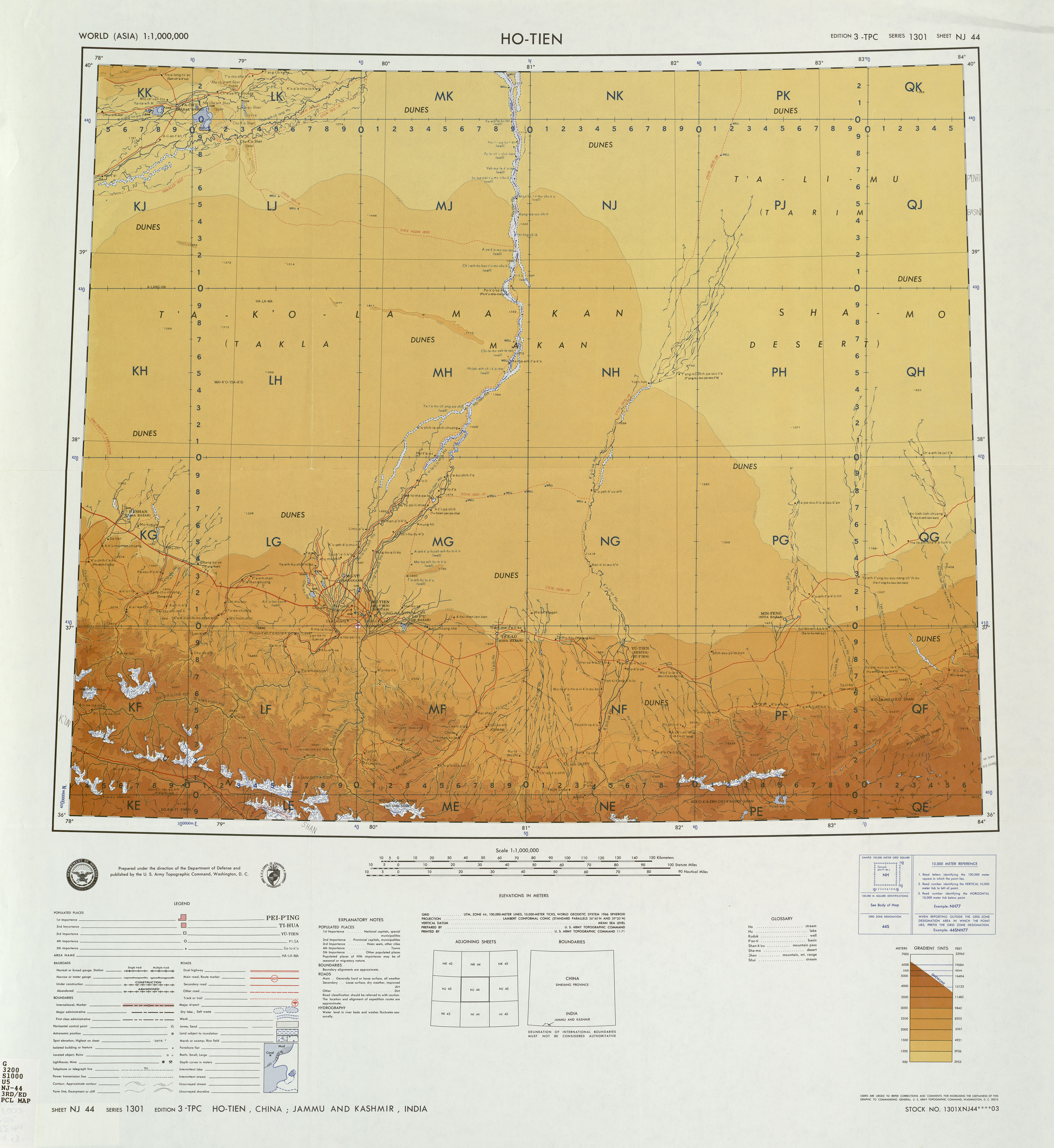
Map including northern Hotan County and surrounding region (USATC, 1971) (Note: From map: "DELINEATION OF INTERNATIONAL BOUNDARIES MUST NOT BE CONSIDERED AUTHORITATIVE".)

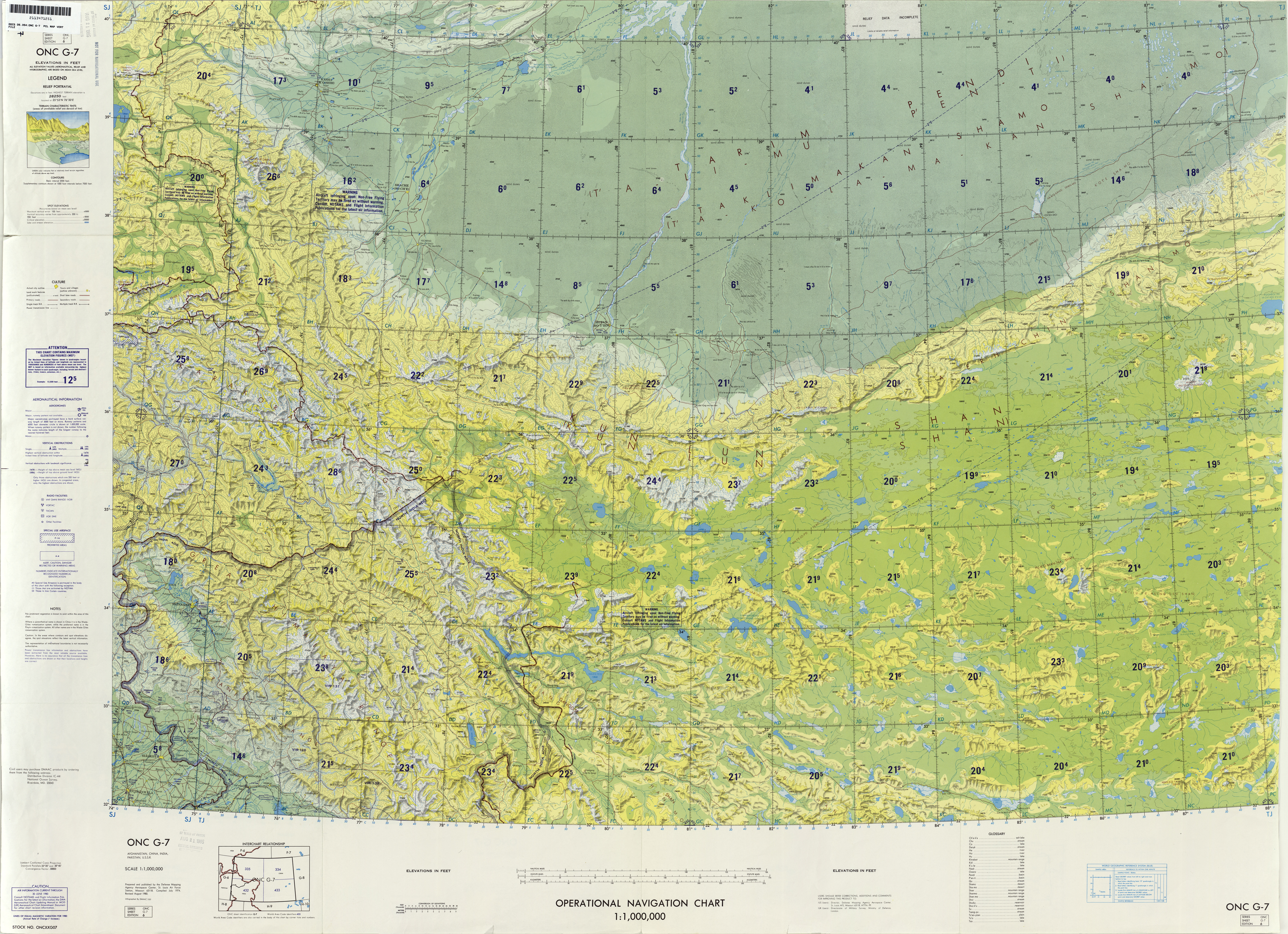
Map including Hotan County area and surrounding region (DMA, 1980) (Note: From map: "The representation of international boundaries is not necessarily authoritative.")

On 18 January 1913, Hotan became a county.

In 1919, Karakax / Moyu County was split off from Hotan County.

In 1933, Muhammad Amin Bughra and his associates declared the Khotan Emirate.

On 22 December 1949, the People's Liberation Army entered Hotan.

In 1959, the Chinese character name for the county was set as '和田'.

In 1962, some of the events of the Sino-Indian War occurred in the disputed Aksai Chin region.

On 12 April 1969, during the Cultural Revolution, the Hotan County People's Government became the Hotan County Revolutionary Committee. In December 1979, the Hotan County Revolutionary Committee was disestablished and the Hotan County People's Government re-established.

In 1983 / 4, the urban area of Hotan was administratively split from the larger Hotan County, and from then on governed as a county-level city.

On 9 September 1995, Vice Premier Zhu Rongji visited Buzhake Township.

On 11 July 2006, the township of Tusalla (Tushala), then part of Hotan County, was transferred to Hotan City.

In 2012, Hanerik (Han'airike) was changed from a township into a town and Uzunsho (Wuzongxiao) township was established.

On 28 July 2013, an incident involving Muslim protesters and local police in Hanerik (Han'airike / Hanairke) occurred. Chinese state media said no one died during the confrontation. There were reports of protester deaths, as many as over 100.

== Geography ==
The northernmost point of the county is in the Taklamakan Desert at the confluence of the White Jade River and Karakash River, which together create the Hotan River.

Major lakes administered as part of Hotan County include the soda lakes Aksai Chin Lake and Surigh Yilganing Kol (Surigh-yilganing Köl; 萨利吉勒干南库勒湖), both part of the disputed Aksai Chin. A Chinese military outpost called Tianshuihai which is named for another lake, Tianshuihai (甜水海), is also in the Hotan County administered part of the disputed Aksai Chin region. The Hotan County-administered part of Aksai Chin includes Tianwendian, site of a Chinese military post.

=== Climate ===
Hotan County has a cool arid climate (Köppen climate classification BWk). The average annual temperature in Hotan is 13.0 °C (55.4 °F). The average annual rainfall is 44.1 mm (1.74 in) with July as the wettest month. The temperatures are highest on average in June, at around 25.8 °C (78.4 °F), and lowest in January, at around −3.9 °C (25.0 °F).

Climate data for Hotan (1981−2010 normals, extremes 1981−2010)
Month	Jan	Feb	Mar	Apr	May	Jun	Jul	Aug	Sep	Oct	Nov	Dec	Year
Record high °C (°F)	20.5 (68.9)	22.0 (71.6)	30.6 (87.1)	34.6 (94.3)	37.6 (99.7)	39.8 (103.6)	41.1 (106.0)	40.2 (104.4)	35.9 (96.6)	30.0 (86.0)	24.7 (76.5)	18.3 (64.9)	41.1 (106.0)
Mean daily maximum °C (°F)	1.3 (34.3)	6.9 (44.4)	15.8 (60.4)	23.5 (74.3)	27.8 (82.0)	31.1 (88.0)	32.6 (90.7)	31.7 (89.1)	27.4 (81.3)	20.6 (69.1)	11.6 (52.9)	3.1 (37.6)	19.5 (67.0)
Daily mean °C (°F)	−3.9 (25.0)	1.3 (34.3)	9.6 (49.3)	16.8 (62.2)	21.1 (70.0)	24.3 (75.7)	25.8 (78.4)	24.9 (76.8)	20.4 (68.7)	13.2 (55.8)	5.1 (41.2)	−2.2 (28.0)	13.0 (55.5)
Mean daily minimum °C (°F)	−8.2 (17.2)	−3.4 (25.9)	4.0 (39.2)	10.7 (51.3)	15.2 (59.4)	18.5 (65.3)	20.0 (68.0)	19.3 (66.7)	14.5 (58.1)	7.0 (44.6)	0.0 (32.0)	−6.3 (20.7)	7.6 (45.7)
Record low °C (°F)	−21.0 (−5.8)	−19.3 (−2.7)	−7.0 (19.4)	−0.2 (31.6)	4.3 (39.7)	9.5 (49.1)	12.2 (54.0)	10.2 (50.4)	4.3 (39.7)	−2.1 (28.2)	−12.3 (9.9)	−19.3 (−2.7)	−21.0 (−5.8)
Average precipitation mm (inches)	1.9 (0.07)	1.9 (0.07)	2.5 (0.10)	2.9 (0.11)	7.2 (0.28)	8.9 (0.35)	7.2 (0.28)	4.6 (0.18)	3.6 (0.14)	1.5 (0.06)	0.5 (0.02)	1.4 (0.06)	44.1 (1.72)
Average relative humidity (%)	54	44	32	29	34	38	43	44	44	41	43	54	42
Source: China Meteorological Data Service Center

== Administrative divisions ==
Hotan County includes two towns, ten townships, and one other area:

Name	Simplified Chinese	Hanyu Pinyin	Uyghur (UEY)	Uyghur Latin (ULY)	Administrative division code	Notes
Towns
Baghchi Town (Bageqi Town)	巴格其镇	Bāgéqí Zhèn	باغچى بازىرى	baghchi baziri	653221100	
Hanerik Town	罕艾日克镇	Hǎn'àirìkè Zhèn	خانئېرىق بازىرى	xan'ëriq baziri	653221102	formerly Hanerik Township (罕艾日克乡)
Townships
Yengiawat Township	英阿瓦提乡	Yīng'āwǎtí Xiāng	يېڭىئاۋات يېزىسى	yëngi'awat yëzisi	653221202	
Yengierik Township	英艾日克乡	Yīng'àirìkè Xiāng	يېڭىئېرىق يېزىسى	yëngi'ëriq yëzisi	653221203	
Bozak Township (Buzhake, Buzak)	布扎克乡	Bùzhákè Xiāng	بۇزاق يېزىسى	buzaq yëzisi	653221204	
Layka Township	拉依喀乡	Lāyīkā Xiāng	لايقا يېزىسى	layqa yëzisi	653221205	
Langru Township	朗如乡	Lǎngrú Xiāng	لاڭرۇ يېزىسى	langru yëzisi	653221206	
Tewekkul Township	塔瓦库勒乡	Tǎwǎkùlè Xiāng	تەۋەككۈل يېزىسى	tewekkül yëzisi	653221207	
Islamawat Township	伊斯拉木阿瓦提乡	Yīsīlāmù'āwǎtí Xiāng	ئىسلامئاۋات يېزىسى	Islam'awat yëzisi	653221208	
Seghizkol Township	色格孜库勒乡	Sègézīkùlè Xiāng	سېغىزكۆل يېزىسى	sëghizköl yëzisi	653221209	
Qashteshi Township (Kashitashi)	喀什塔什乡	Kāshítǎshí Xiāng	قاشتېشى يېزىسى	qashtëshi yëzisi	653221210	
Uzunsho Township	吾宗肖乡	Wúzōngxiāo Xiāng	ئۇزۇنشو يېزىسى	Uzunsho yëzisi	653221211	

Other:

- Hotan County Economic New Area (和田县经济新区)

== Economy ==
The county is known for Hotan Silk, Hotan Jade and Hotan Carpets. The county's agricultural products include wheat, rice, corn, melons, cotton, and silkworm cocoons.

== Demographics ==
Historical population
Year	Pop.	±% p.a.
2000	261,498	—
2010	269,941	+0.32%

In 1997, the population of Hotan County was 99% Uyghur.

As of 1999, 99.41% of the population of Hotan (Hetian) County was Uyghur and 0.46% of the population was Han Chinese.

As of 2015, 325,117 of the 327,533 residents of the county were Uyghur, 2,023 were Han Chinese and 393 were from other ethnic groups.

In 2019, the population of Hotan County was 99% Uyghur.

== Transportation ==
- China National Highway 315
- China National Highway 219, which passes through the disputed Aksai Chin region
