= Hotan Prefecture =

Prefecture of Xinjiang, China

Coordinates: 37.11°N 79.91°E

Hotan Prefecture: خوتەن ۋىلايىتى (Uyghur); 和田地区 (Chinese)
- Prefecture
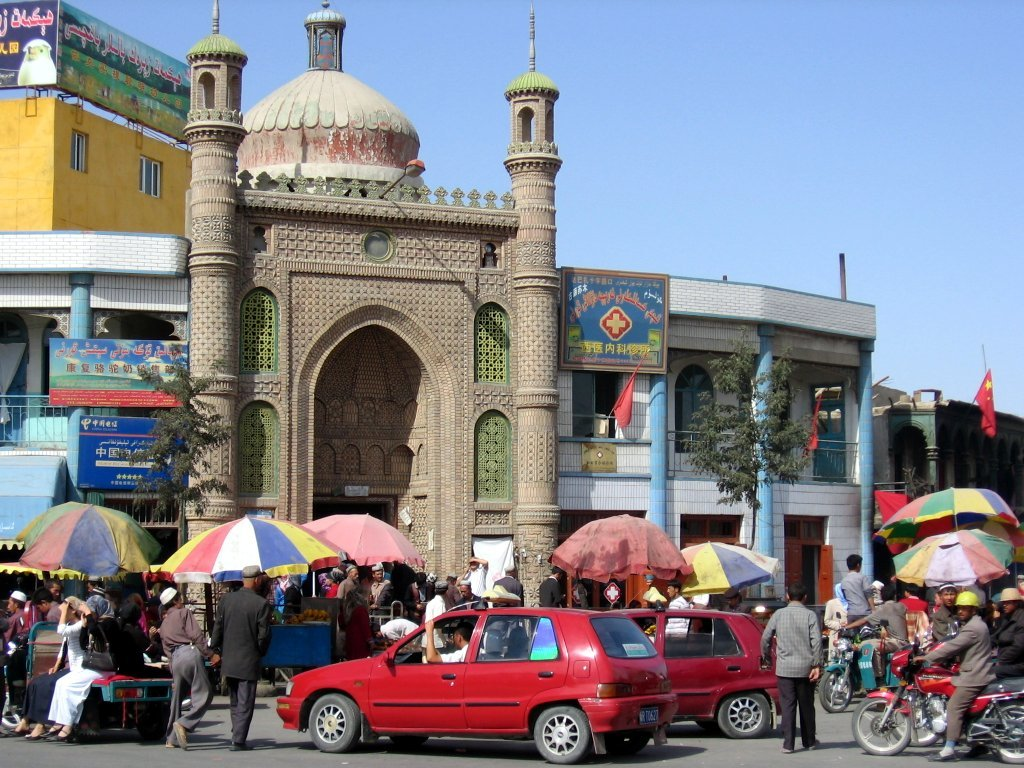
- In front of the Hotan Mosque in Hotan City

- Hotan prefecture (red) (including Kunyu) in Xinjiang (orange)
- Country: People's Republic of China
- Region: Xinjiang
- Seat: Hotan

Government
  - CPC Secretary (地委书记): Yang Fasen (杨发森)

Area (Note: includes areas in Aksai Chin)
  - Total: 248,059.54 km^{2} (95,776.32 sq mi)

Population (2020 Census)
  - Total: 2,441,231
  - Density: 9.841311/km^{2} (25.48888/sq mi)

Ethnic groups
  - Major ethnic groups: Uyghur, Han Chinese

GDP
  - Total: CN¥ 46.7 billion US$ 7.1 billion
  - Per capita: CN¥ 18,235; US$ 2,827
- Time zone: UTC+8 (China Standard)
- ISO 3166 code: CN-XJ-32
- Website: xjht.gov.cn

Hotan Prefecture

Uyghur name
- Uyghur: خوتەن ۋىلايىتى
Transcriptions
- Latin Yëziqi: Xoten Wilayiti
- Yengi Yeziⱪ: Hotən Vilayiti
- SASM/GNC: Hotän Vilayiti
- Siril Yëziqi: Хотән Вилайити

Chinese name
- Simplified Chinese: 和田地区
- Traditional Chinese: 和田地區
Transcriptions
Standard Mandarin
- Hanyu Pinyin: Hétián Dìqū
- Bopomofo: ㄏㄜˊ ㄊㄧㄢˊ ㄉㄧˋ ㄑㄩ
- Gwoyeu Romatzyh: Hertyan Dihchiu
- Wade–Giles: Ho²-tʻien² Ti⁴-chʻü¹
- IPA: [xɤ̌.tʰjɛ̌n tî.tɕʰý]

Hotan Prefecture (see also § Etymology) is located in the Tarim Basin region of southwestern Xinjiang, China, bordering the Tibet Autonomous Region to the south and Union Territory of Ladakh and Gilgit-Baltistan to the west. The vast majority of the Aksai Chin region which is disputed between China and India is administered as part of Hotan Prefecture. The seat of Hotan Prefecture is Hotan and its largest county by population is Karakax County. The vast majority of the residents of the prefecture are Muslim Uyghurs and live around oases situated between the desolate Taklamakan Desert and Kunlun Mountains.

The region was the center of the ancient Iranian Saka Buddhist Kingdom of Khotan. Later, the region was part of the Kara-Khanid Khanate, followed by the Qara Khitai, Chagatai Khanate, Moghulistan and the Dzungar Khanate, which was conquered by the Qing dynasty of China. Hotan became part of Xinjiang under Qing rule. The prefecture is known for its jade, silk and carpets.

== Etymology ==
Hotan Prefecture is named for its seat, Hotan (or Khotan). The area was originally known as Godana in ancient Sanskrit cosmological texts. The Chinese transcribed the name as 于窴, pronounced Gudana in Middle Chinese (Yutian in modern Standard Chinese); the pronunciation eventually morphed into Khotan. In the 7th century, the Chinese Buddhist monk and scholar Xuanzang attempted to remedy this lexical change. Xuanzang, who was well-versed in Sanskrit, proposed that the traditional name was in fact Kustana (गौस्तन) and asserted it meant "breast of the Earth". However, this was likely borrowed from the Tibetan name for the region, Gosthana, which means "land of cows". It is therefore most likely that the original name of Hotan was Sanskritic in origin, a consequence of ancient Indian settlement in the area.

The official Uyghur-Latin transliteration, and therefore English spelling, of the modern city's name is "Hotan" according to the Register of Chinese Geographic Places. The Hanyu pinyin romanization Hetian has also been used on some maps.

== History ==
In 1755, the Qing Empire defeated the Dzungar Khanate. In 1759 (the 24th year of the Qianlong reign), an Imperial Resident (Amban) was established in Khotan, placed under the authority of the Resident in Yarkand, and the Baishan faction was completely suppressed. Under Qing rule, a small number of officials and troops were stationed in Khotan, serving as one of the bases for local administration. From the eighteenth to the nineteenth century, the population of Khotan gradually increased, and residential areas expanded beyond the old city walls. In 1828, a new city was constructed near the old city for defensive purposes. The Hotan Prefecture region played a major part in the Dungan Revolt (1862–1877).

In 1913, Hetian Directly Administered Subprefecture was reorganized as Hetian County. In 1915, Moyu County was established, carved out of Hetian County. In 1920, the Hetian Circuit was created. In 1928, it was restructured into the Hetian Administrative Region, with an Administrative Commissioner's Office established. In 1929, Cele County was established. In 1943, the Hetian Administrative Region was reorganized as Hetian Special District, with an Inspectorate Commissioner's Office set up. In 1947, Minfeng County was established.

On 22 December 1949, PLA forces reached Hotan. In 1950, the area was redesignated as Hotan District (和闐專區). In 1959, the Chinese character name of Hotan was changed from '和阗' to the homophonous '和田'. In 1962, events of the Sino-Indian War occurred in parts of Aksai Chin administered as part of Hotan Prefecture. In 1971, Hotan was changed from a district (专区) to a prefecture (地区). In 1977, the Hotan Prefecture Administrative Office was established. In 1979, the Hotan Administrative Office was created. In September 1983, Hotan City was established, carved out of Hotan County.

In 2016, Kunyu was established within the boundaries of Hotan Prefecture. In December 2024, the State Council approved the establishment of He'an County and Hekang County, to be administered by Hotan Prefecture.

== Geography ==
The vast majority of the residents live around oases situated between the desolate Taklamakan Desert and Kunlun Mountains. To the north, the prefecture borders Aksu Prefecture, to the east Bayingolin Mongol Autonomous Prefecture, to the west Kashgar Prefecture, and to the south, Tibet and the areas disputed between China, India and Pakistan. Aksai Chin includes the southernmost point administered as part of Xinjiang. Most of the prefecture has a cold desert climate.

Hotan Prefecture contains 36 rivers of varying sizes, including the Andir River, Niya River, Keriya River, Cele River, Yurungkash River, Karakash River, Sangzhu River, Pishan River, Galwan River, Tiannan River, Changlong River, Salijilganxi River, and Chip Chap River, with a total annual runoff of 7.4 billion cubic meters.

These rivers exhibit extreme seasonal variation: flooding is common in summer, while severe drought occurs in autumn and winter, and water is especially scarce in spring, with only about 7% of the annual runoff occurring in April–May. Most rivers in Hotan Prefecture are inland (endorheic) rivers. They can generally be divided into five inland drainage basins: Pishan, Hotan–Moyu–Lop, Cele–Yutian–Minfeng, and the Qiangtang Plateau lake region. In addition, there is an outflow basin belonging to the Indian Ocean system, represented by the Chip Chap River, with an annual outflow of 293 million cubic meters. In the plains area, there are 36 rivers in total, of which 30 are utilized for irrigation and for drinking water for both humans and livestock.

== Administrative divisions ==
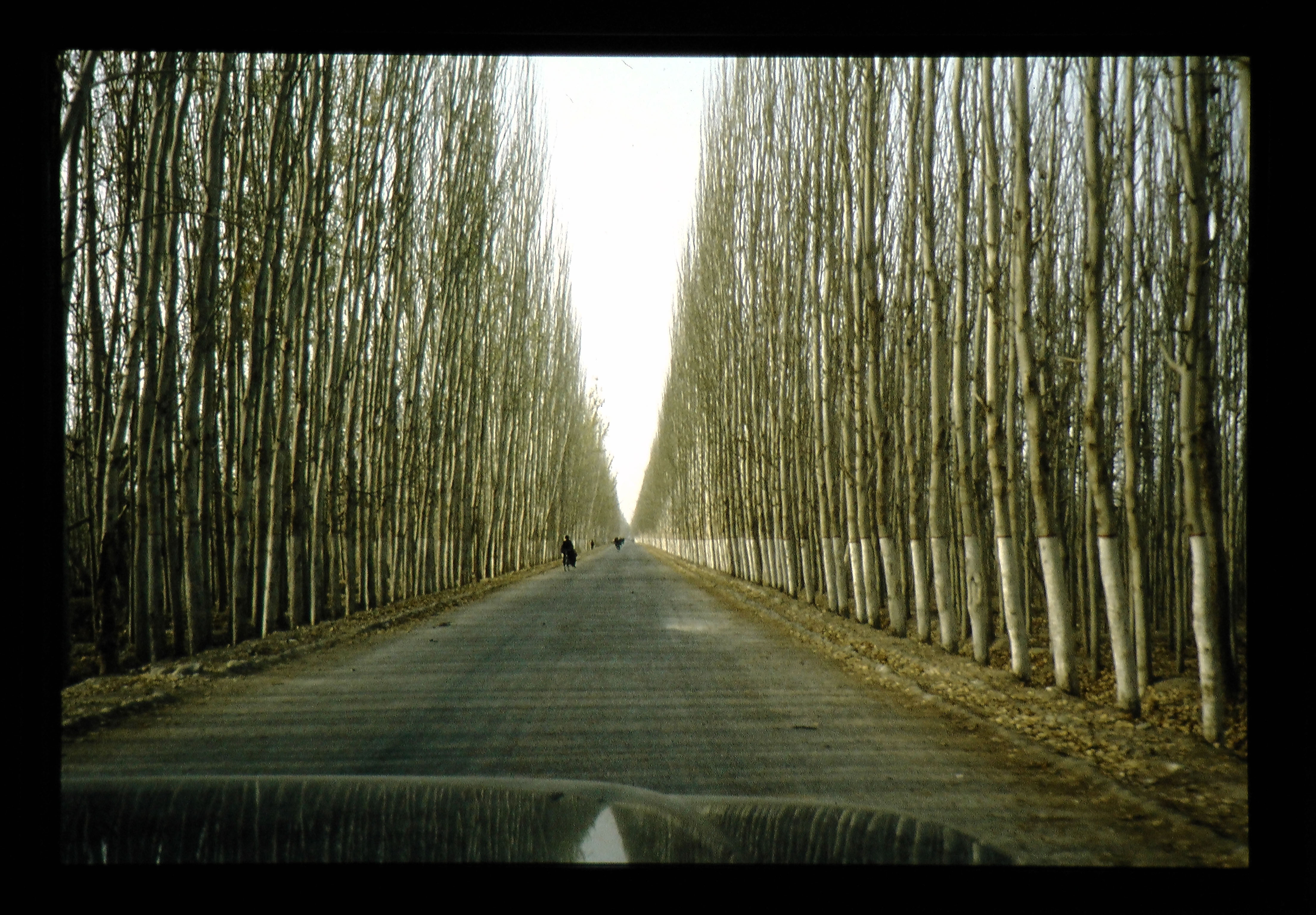
Windbreak forest in Hotan, July 1993

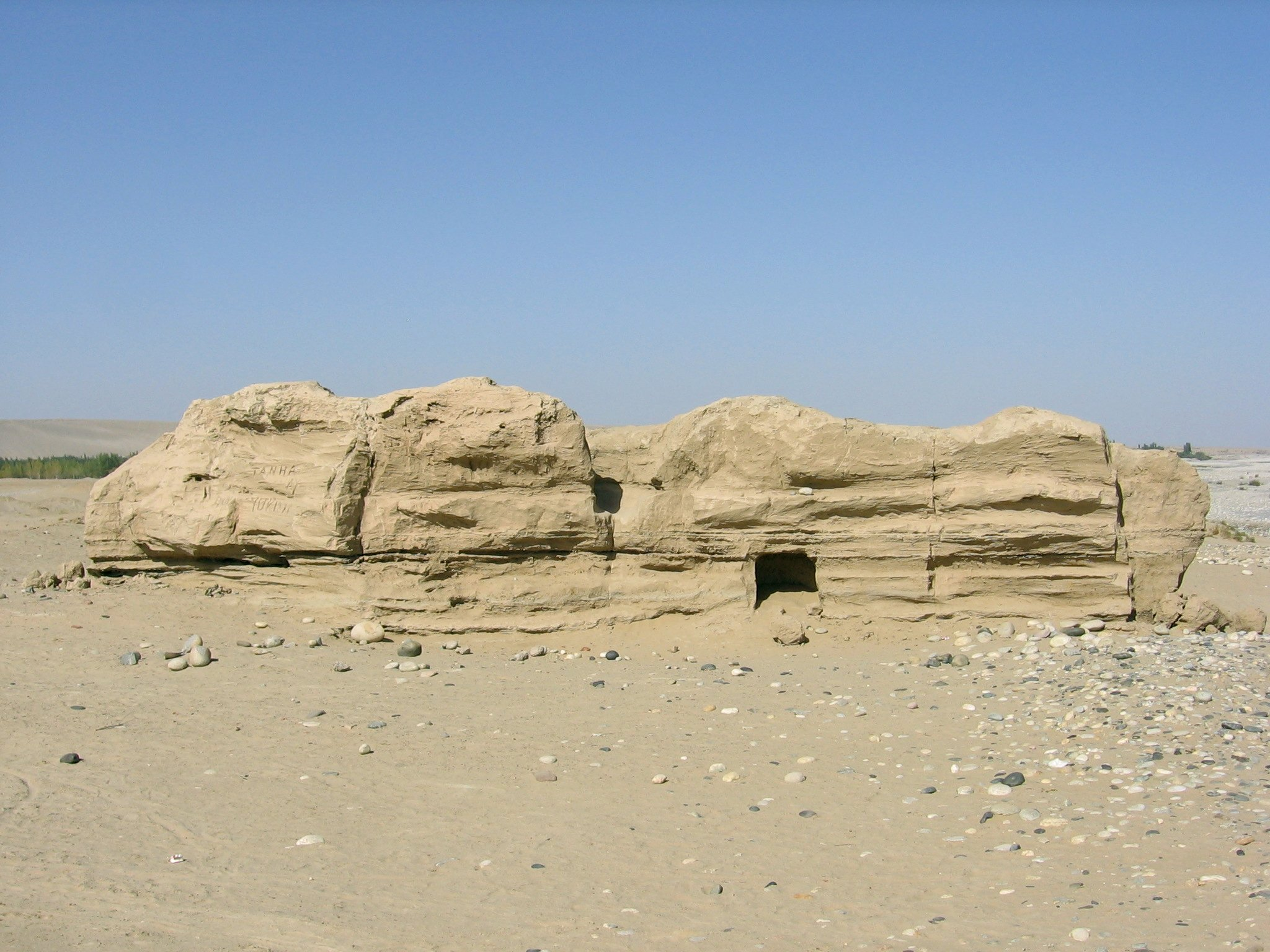
Melikawat

The Hotan Prefecture is divided into one county-level city and seven counties and surrounds Kunyu:

#	Name	Uyghur (UEY)	Uyghur Latin (ULY)	Chinese (S)	Hanyu Pinyin	Population (2020)	Area (km^{2})	Density (/km^{2})
1	Hotan (Hetian)	خوتەن شەھىرى	Hoten Shehiri	和田市	Hétián Shì	501,028	466	1074.15
2	Hotan County (Hetian)	خوتەن ناھىيىسى	Xoten Nahiyisi	和田县	Hétián Xiàn	324,603	41,080 (Note: includes areas in Aksai Chin)	7.90
3	Karakax County (Moyu)	قاراقاش ناھىيىسى	Qaraqash Nahiyisi	墨玉县	Mòyù Xiàn	571,648	25,608	22.32
4	Pishan County (Guma)	گۇما ناھىيىسى	Guma Nahiyisi	皮山县	Píshān Xiàn	281,573	39,463	7.14
5	Lop County (Luopu)	لوپ ناھىيىسى	Lop Nahiyisi	洛浦县	Luòpǔ Xiàn	286,900	14,114	20.33
6	Qira County (Chira, Cele)	چىرا ناھىيىسى	Chira Nahiyisi	策勒县	Cèlè Xiàn	157,792	31,592	4.99
7	Keriya County (Yutian)	كېرىيە ناھىيىسى	Kériye Nahiyisi	于田县	Yútián Xiàn	257,038	39,033	6.59
8	Niya County (Minfeng)	نىيە ناھىيىسى	Niye Nahiyisi	民丰县	Mínfēng Xiàn	42,649	56,703	0.75
9	He'an County	قىزىليۇلغۇن (خېئەن) ناھىيىسى	Qizilyulghun (Xé'en) Nahiyisi	和安县	Hé'ān Xiàn			
10	Hekang County	شەيدۇللا (خېكاڭ) ناھىيىسى	Sheydulla (Xékang) Nahiyisi	和康县	Hékāng Xiàn			

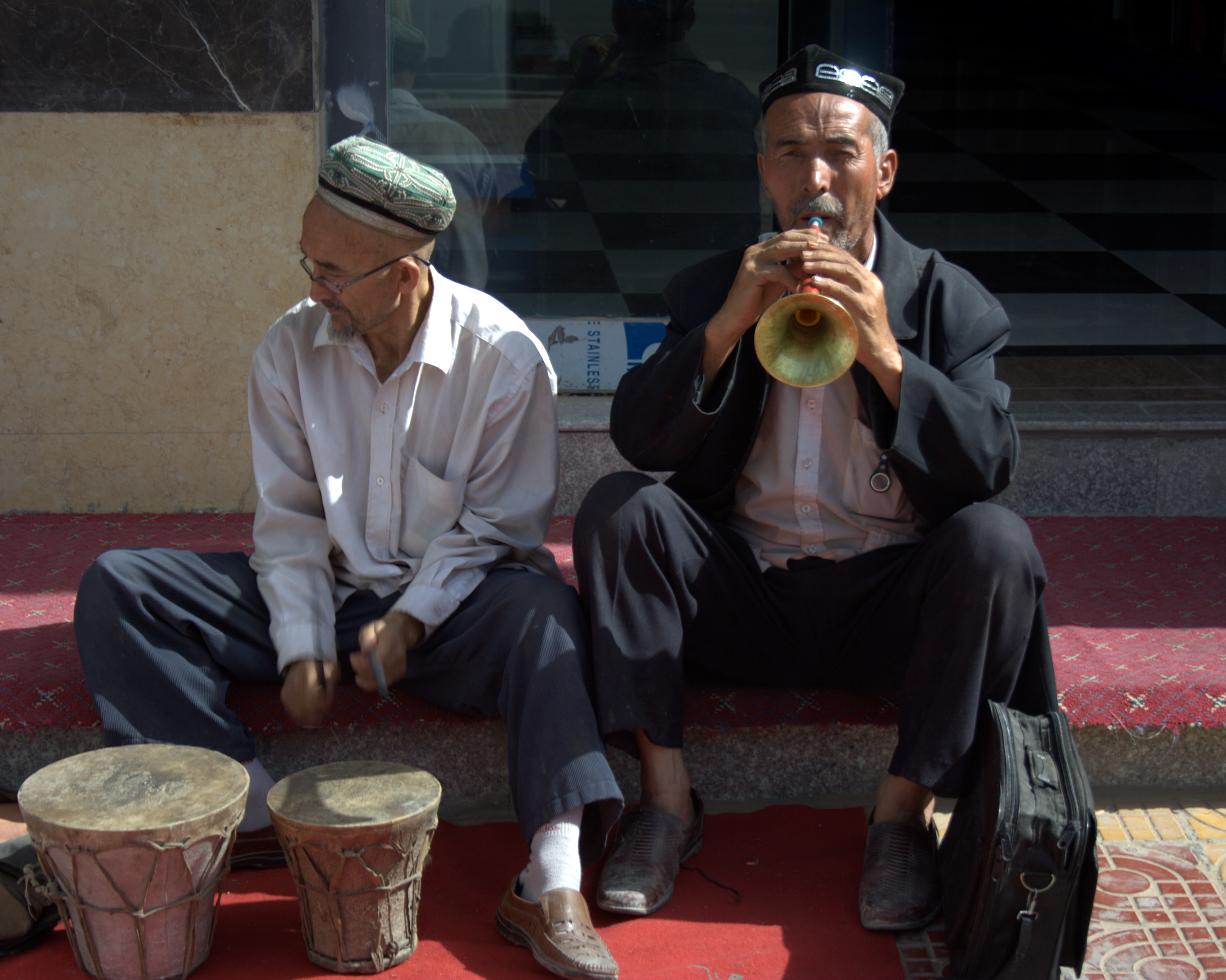
Musicians at Hotan Sunday Market

== Demographics ==
Historical population
Year	Pop.	±% p.a.
2000	1,681,310	—
2010	2,014,362	+1.82%
2015	2,324,287	+2.90%

As of 2015, 2,248,113 (96.7%) of the 2,324,287 residents of the prefecture were Uyghur, 71,233 were Han Chinese (3.1%) and 4,941 were from other ethnic groups.

In 2014, according to a local government employee in the township of Langru in Hotan County, "Islamic beliefs are very strong" in the prefecture.

As of the 2000s, the population of Hotan Prefecture was more than 95% Uyghur.

As of 1999, 96.9% of the population of Hotan (Hetian) Prefecture was Uyghur and 3.1% of the population was Han Chinese.

Residents of Hotan Prefecture commonly speak Uyghur and often do not speak Mandarin Chinese.

== Notable persons ==
- Ismail Amat, former Chairman (Governor) of Xinjiang
- Islam Akhun, con-man
- Juma Tayir, imam of the Id Kah Mosque, murdered by ETIM terrorists
- Kurban Tulum, Member of the Fourth National People's Congress, a symbol of unity between Han people and the Uyghurs
- Ablajan Awut Ayup, a pop singer, songwriter and dancer
- Abdul Haq al-Turkistani, militant

== Historical maps ==
Historical English-language maps including modern-day Hotan Prefecture area:

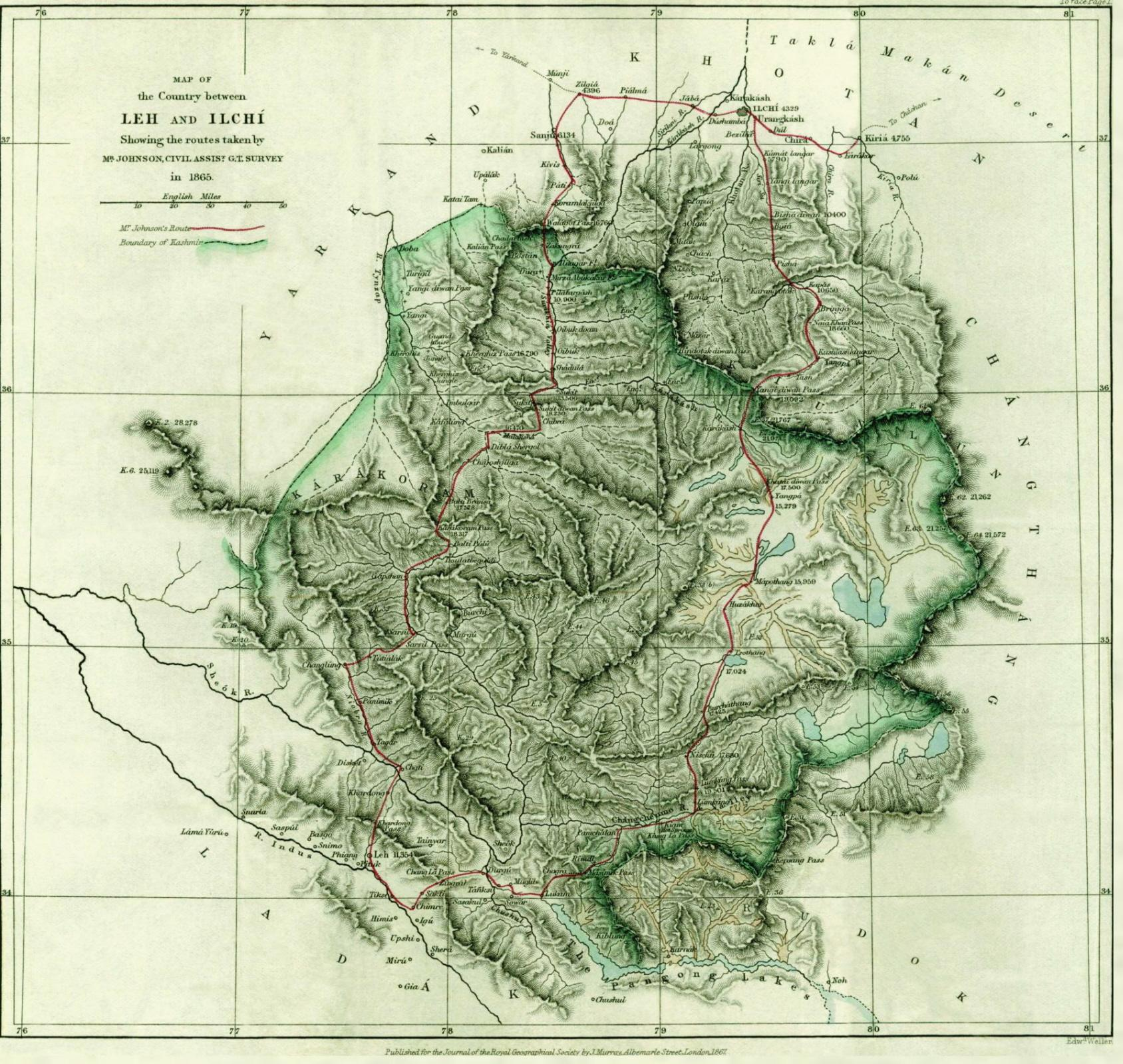
Map including ILCHÍ (1865)

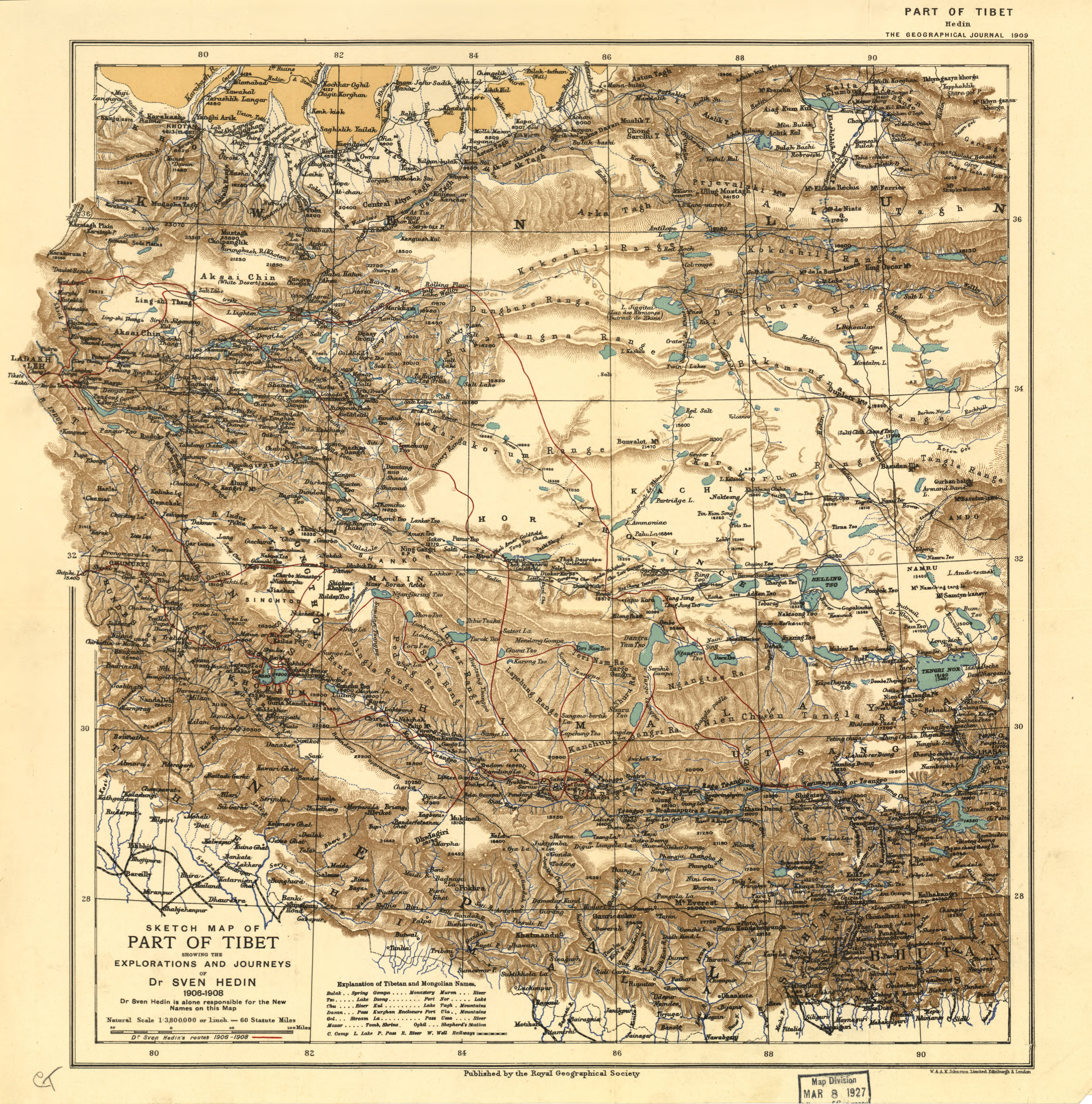
Map of the expeditions of Sven Hedin (1906-8) including the southern part of the modern Hotan Prefecture (RGS, early 20th century)

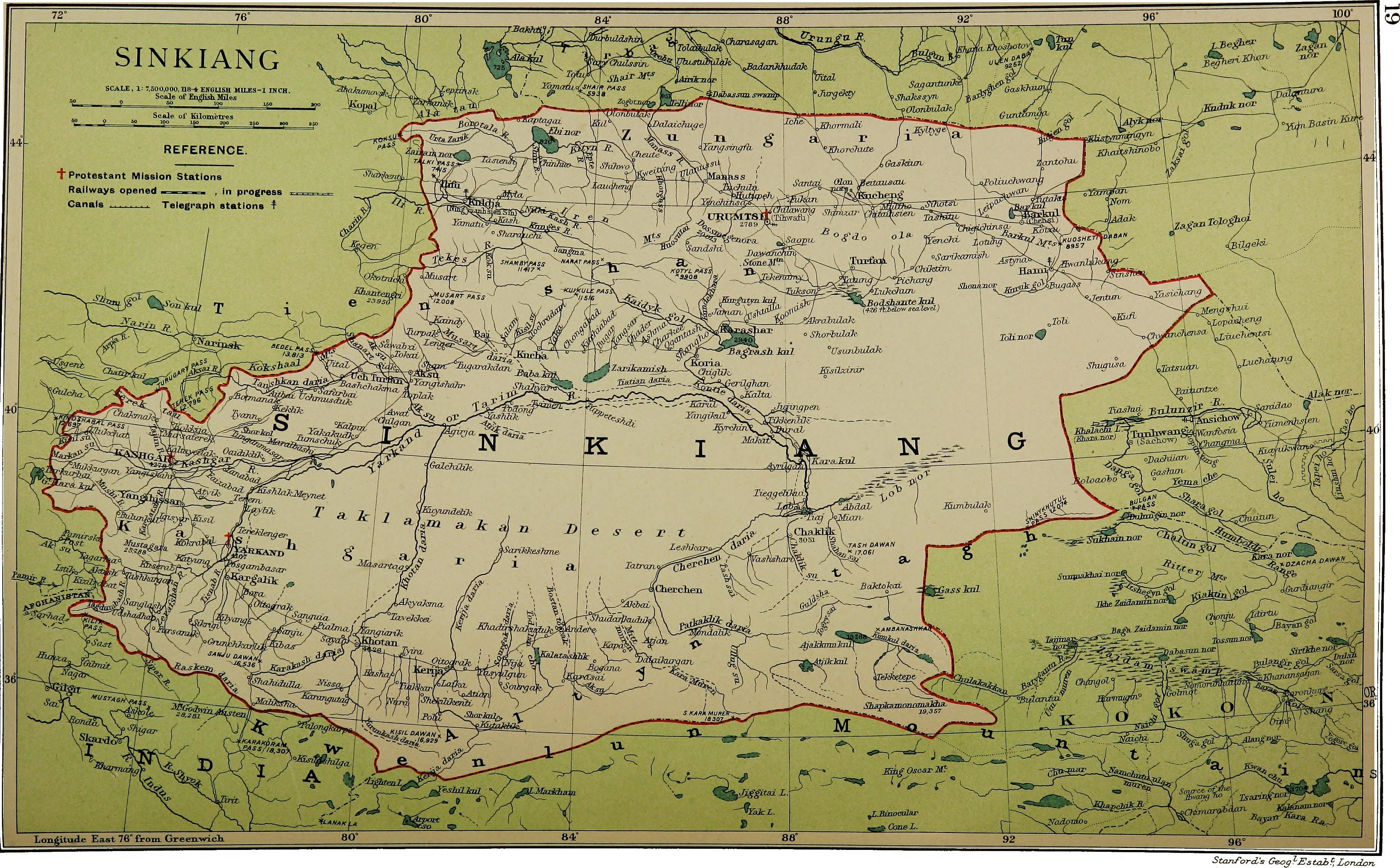
Map including Hotan (labeled as Khotan) (1917)

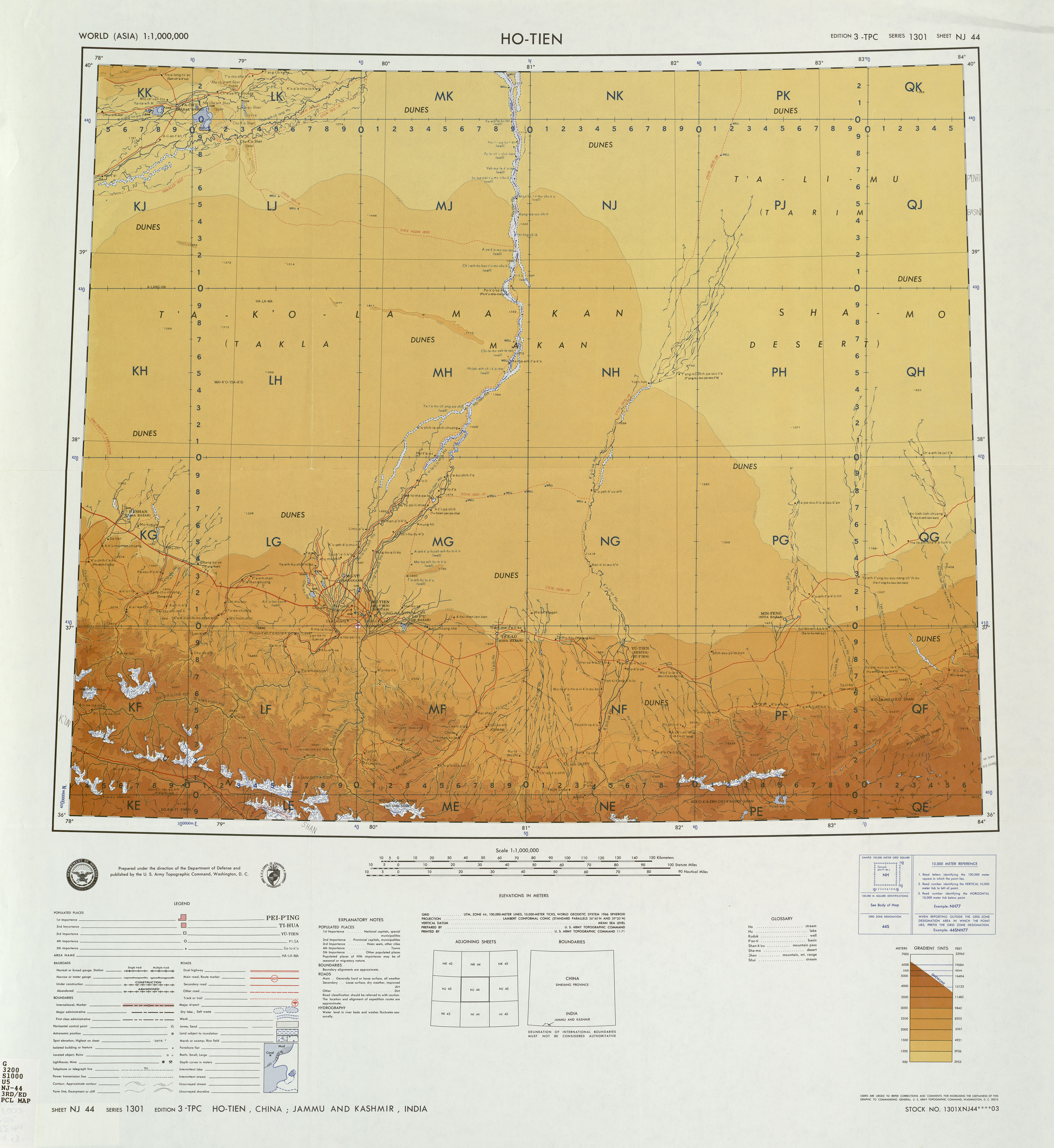
Map including most of northern Hotan Prefecture area (USATC, 1971) (Note: From map: "DELINEATION OF INTERNATIONAL BOUNDARIES MUST NOT BE CONSIDERED AUTHORITATIVE".)

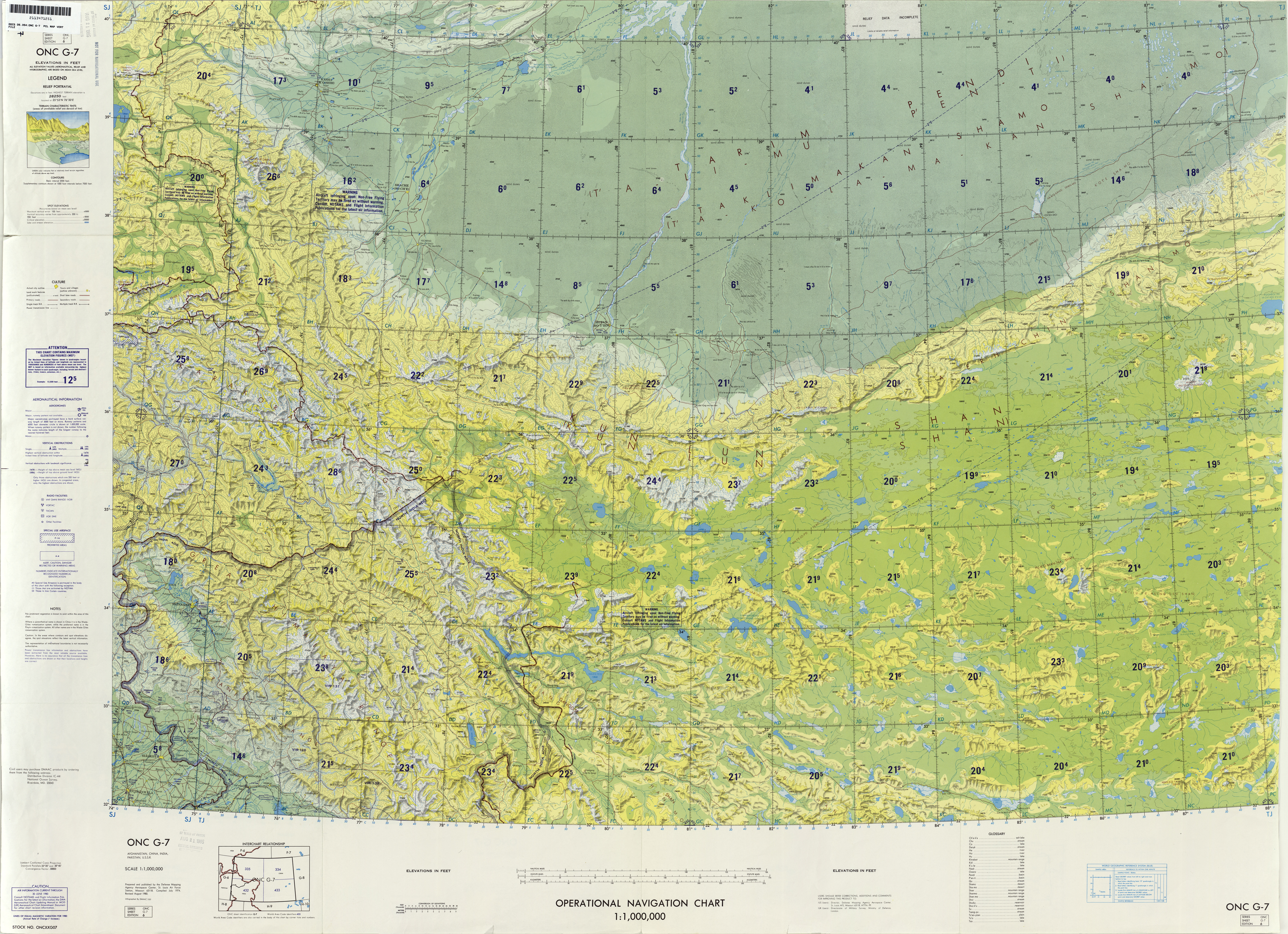
From the Operational Navigation Chart; map including Hotan Prefecture area (DMA, 1980) (Note: From map: "The representation of international boundaries is not necessarily authoritative.")

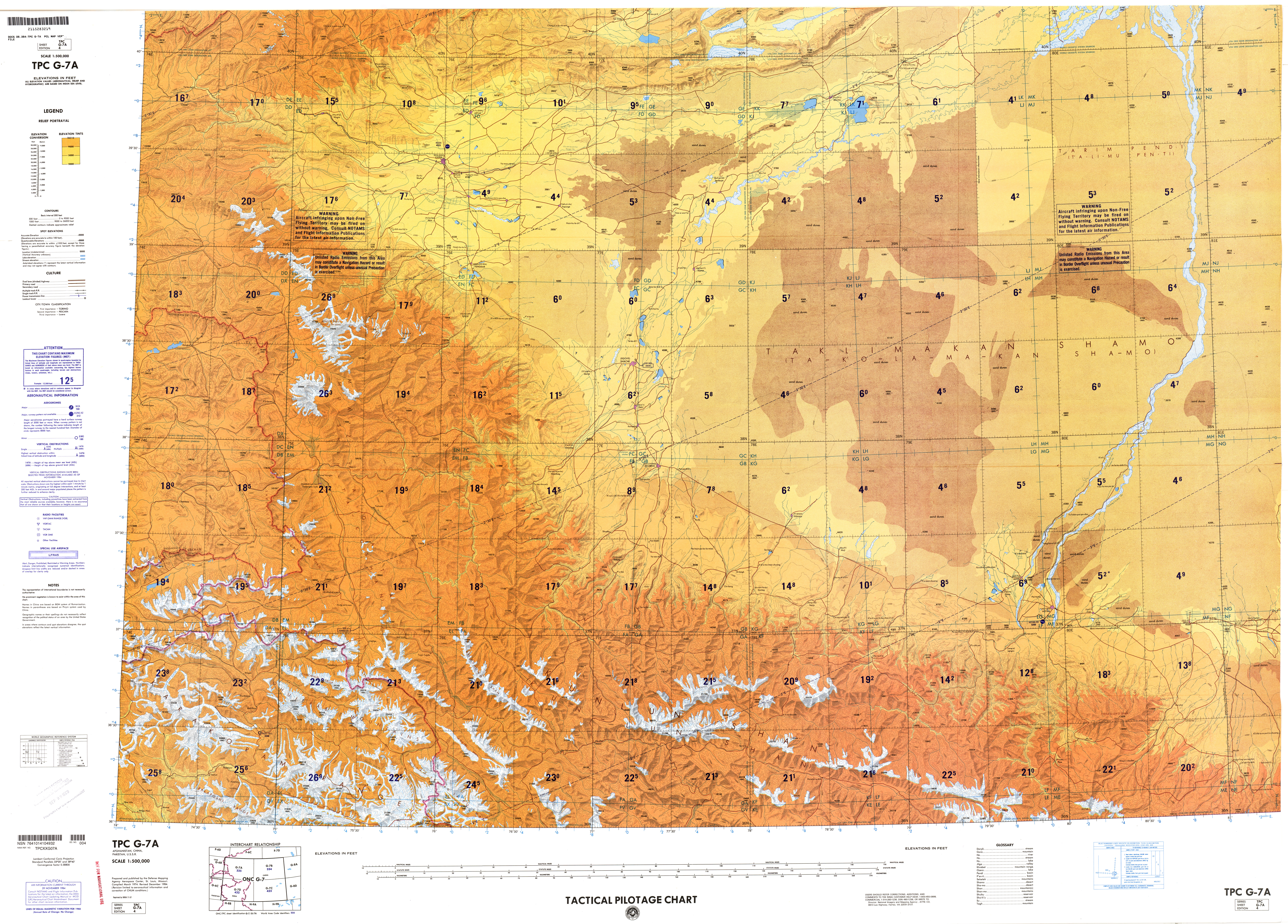
Map including Hotan Prefecture area (northwest) (DMA, 1984) (Note: From map: "The representation of international boundaries is not necessarily authoritative")

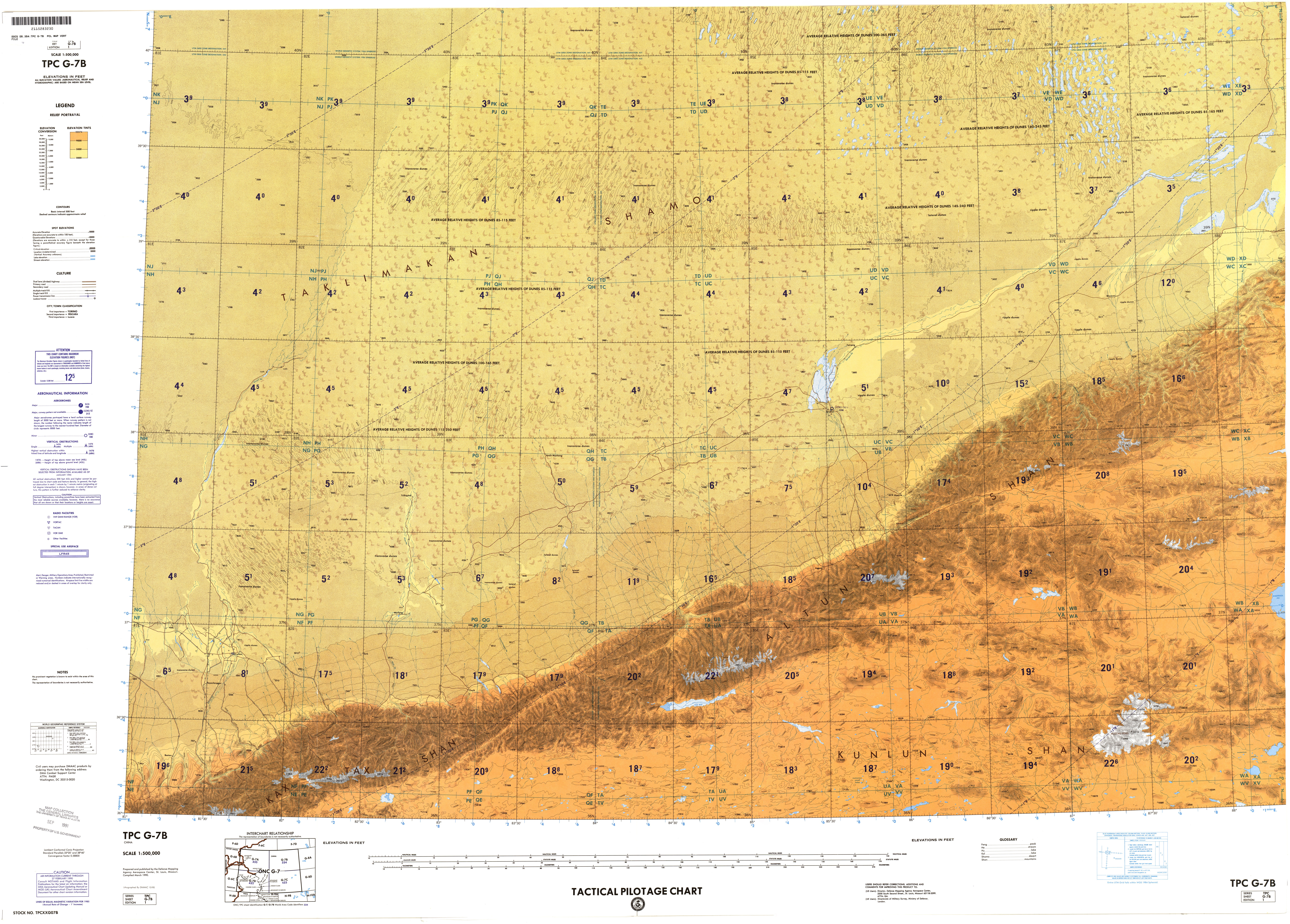
Map including Hotan Prefecture area (northeast) (DMA, 1990) (Note: From map: "The representation of boundaries is not necessarily authoritative.")

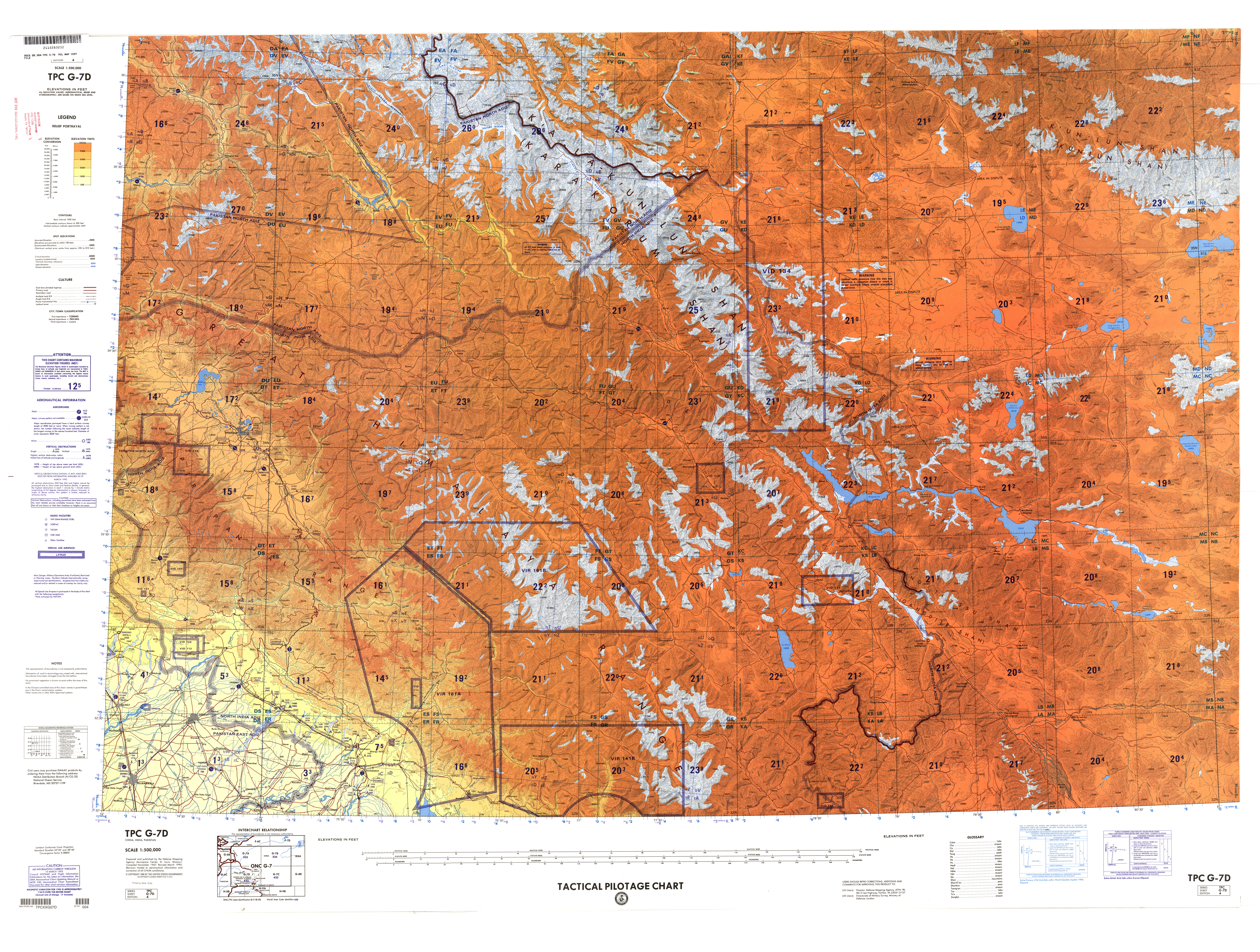
Map including Hotan Prefecture area (southwest) with Aksai Chin (DMA, 1995) (Note: From map: "The representation of boundaries is not necessarily authoritative.")
