= Uyghur Forced Labor Prevention Act =

United States sanctions law

- Long title: "An Act to ensure that goods made with forced labor in the Xinjiang Uyghur Autonomous Region of the People's Republic of China do not enter the United States market, and for other purposes."
- Enacted by: the 117th United States Congress
- Effective: December 23, 2021

Citations
- Public law: Pub. L. 117–78 (text) (PDF)
- Statutes at Large: 135 Stat. 1525

Legislative history
- Introduced in the House as H.R. 6256 by Jim McGovern (D–MA) on December 14, 2021; Committee consideration by House Foreign Affairs, House Ways and Means, and House Judiciary; Passed the House on December 14, 2021 (voice vote); Passed the Senate on December 16, 2021 (unanimous consent); Signed into law by President Joe Biden on December 23, 2021

The Uyghur Forced Labor Prevention Act (H.R. 6256) is a United States federal law that changed U.S. policy on China's Xinjiang Uyghur Autonomous Region (XUAR, or Xinjiang) with the goal of ensuring that American entities are not funding forced labor among ethnic minorities in the region. It was signed into law in December 2021 and starting from June 21, 2022, any company that imports goods from the Xinjiang region needs to certify that those goods were not produced using forced labor in order to avoid penalties.

== Background ==
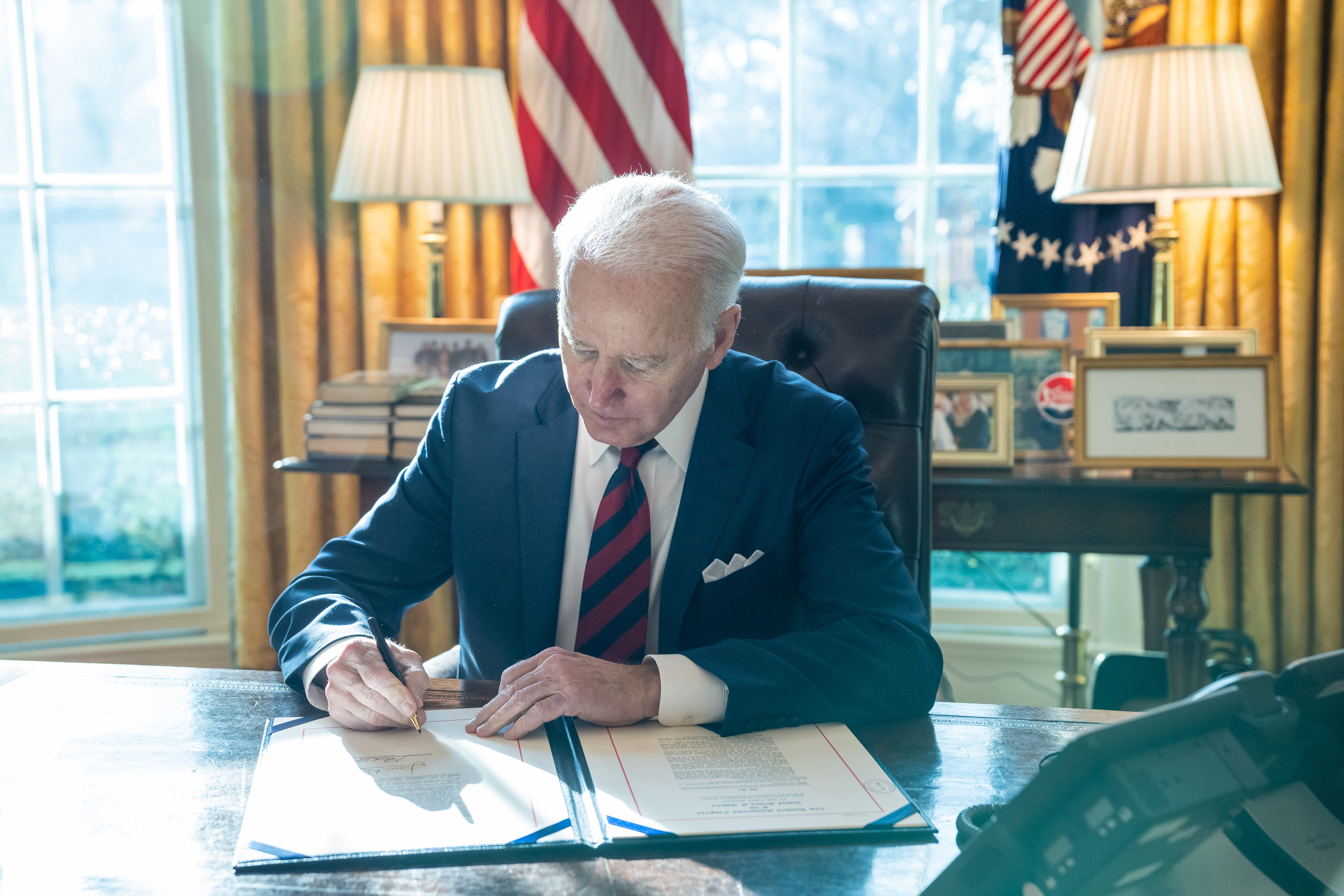
President Joe Biden signing the act, on December 23, 2021

=== Xinjiang and allegations of forced labor ===
Between 2014 and 2018, the cotton industry in Xinjiang saw a massive increase in output and employment.

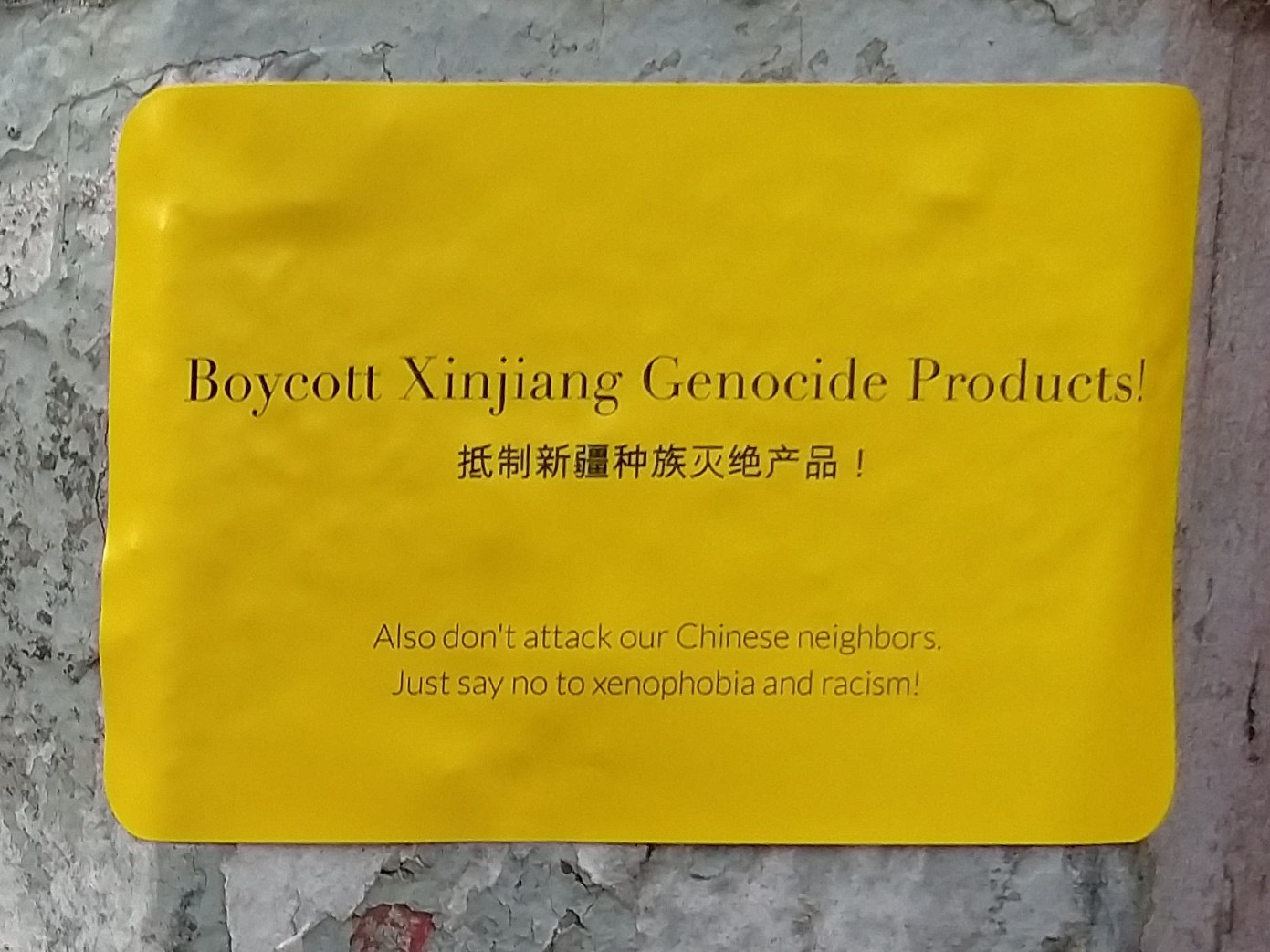
Xinjiang boycott advert on NYU's campus in New York, NY "Boycott Xinjiang Genocide Products! 抵制新疆种族灭绝产品！ Also don't attack our Chinese neighbors. Just say no to xenophobia and racism!"

According to an August 2019 book by Han Lianchao, Vice President of Citizen Power Initiatives for China, forced labor is so commonplace in Xinjiang that it is difficult to separate the forced labor economy from the regular economy. Han estimates that there are 500,000 to 800,000 people held in the more than seventy prisons in Xinjiang and that these prisoners are used for forced labor in numerous industries. Han further suspects that the million Uyghurs in the Xinjiang re-education camps are likely also used for forced labor in a similar manner. Han says that because Xinjiang supplies nearly 84 percent of China's cotton, any cotton, textile or garment products from China are likely tainted with forced labor. Han's study concludes that products of this forced labor system have entered into international commerce, including the US and Europe, and that governments, companies and consumers should assume that any cotton products sourced from China are the product of forced labor in Xinjiang (XUAR). The report recommended banning certain imports from Xinjiang to the United States.

In September 2019, Nury Turkel, a Uyghur American lawyer and human rights advocate, testified to Congress that Uyghurs were being swept into a vast system of forced labor. Turkel said persons in the camps are often moved to factories and recommended bans on cotton and textile products from Xinjiang until internment policies are abolished and conditions for due diligence are established.

In November 2019, Nathan Ruser, researcher at the Australian Strategic Policy Institute said

You can't be sure that you don't have coerced labour in your supply chain if you do cotton business in China ... Xinjiang labour and what is almost certainly coerced labour is very deeply entrenched into the supply chain that exists in Xinjiang.

According to an August 2020 piece in The New York Times (NYT), it was estimated that roughly one in five cotton garments sold globally contains cotton or yarn from Xinjiang. It also reported that investigations by NYT, Wall Street Journal, and Axios found evidence connecting the detention of Uyghurs to supply chains of major fashion retailers.

On September 17, 2020, China's State Council Information Office rejected claims of forced labor in Xinjiang, saying that ideologically biased international forces have applied double standards to Xinjiang and denied recognition of local efforts to protect human rights.

On October 21, 2020, the Subcommittee on International Human Rights (SDIR) of the Canadian House of Commons Standing Committee on Foreign Affairs and International Development called on the Canadian government to condemn Beijing's policies against the Uyghurs, which the subcommittee said included forced labor.

=== Existing legislation and bans ===
Since 1930, all goods made with forced labor have been banned in the United States under the Smoot–Hawley Tariff Act. Under current rules, the Act bans the import of any "goods, wares, articles, and merchandise mined, produced, or manufactured wholly or in part in any foreign country by convict labor or/and forced labor or/and indentured labor under penal sanctions".

On September 14, 2020, the U.S. Department of Homeland Security blocked imports of products from four entities in Xinjiang: all products made with labor from the Lop County No. 4 Vocational Skills Education and Training Center; hair products made in the Lop County Hair Product Industrial Park; apparel produced by Yili Zhuowan Garment Manufacturing Co., Ltd. and Baoding LYSZD Trade and Business Co., Ltd; and cotton produced and processed by Xinjiang Junggar Cotton and Linen Co., Ltd.

On December 2, 2020, citing forced labor concerns, the U.S. Customs and Border Protection's (CBP) Office of Trade issued a Withhold Release Order (WRO) directing personnel at all U.S. ports of entry to detain all shipments containing cotton and cotton products originating from the Xinjiang Production and Construction Corps (XPCC).

U.S. sanctions related to Xinjiang
Manufacturer(s)	Date	Merchandise	Pursuant to	Status
Baoding LYSZD Trade and Business Co., Ltd.	September 3, 2020	Apparel	Withhold Release Order (WRO)	
Beijing Liuhe BGI (subsidiary of BGI Group)	July 20, 2020	DNA Testing	Entity List	
Changji Esquel Textile Co. Ltd. (subsidiary of Esquel Group)	July 20, 2020	Apparel	Entity List	
Hefei Bitland Information Technology Co., Ltd.	July 20, 2020	Computer parts	Entity List	
Hefei Bitland Information Technology Co., Ltd.	September 8, 2020	Computer parts	WRO	
Hero Vast Group	August 11, 2020	Garments	WRO	
Hetian Haolin Hair Accessories Co., Ltd.	May 1, 2020	Hair products	WRO	
Hetian Haolin Hair Accessories Co., Ltd.	July 20, 2020	Hair products	Entity List	
Hefei Meiling Co. Ltd.	July 20, 2020	Home appliances	Entity List	
Hetian Taida Apparel Co., Ltd.	September 30, 2019	Garments	WRO	
Hetian Taida Apparel Co., Ltd.	July 20, 2020	Garments	Entity List	
KTK Group	July 20, 2020	Ceiling panels and other components	Entity List	
Lop County Hair Product Industrial Park	August 25, 2020	Hair products	WRO	
Lop County Meixin Hair Products Co., Ltd.	June 17, 2020	Hair products	WRO	
Nanchang O-Film Tech	July 20, 2020	Electronics	Entity List	
Nanjing Synergy Textiles Co. Ltd.	July 20, 2020	Textiles	Entity List	
No. 4 Vocation Skills Education Training Center (VSETC)	August 25, 2020	Labor	WRO	
Tanyuan Technology Co. Ltd.	July 20, 2020	Electronics	Entity List	
Yili Zhuowan Garment Manufacturing Co., Ltd.	September 3, 2020	Apparel	WRO	
Xinjiang Junggar Cotton and Linen Co., Ltd.	September 8, 2020	Cotton and processed cotton	WRO	
Xinjiang Production and Construction Corps	December 2, 2020	Cotton and processed cotton	WRO	
Xinjiang Silk Road BGI (subsidiary of BGI Group)	July 20, 2020	DNA Testing	Entity List	

== Legislative history ==
Congress	Short title	Bill number(s)	Date introduced	Sponsor(s)	# of cosponsors	Latest status
116th Congress	Uyghur Forced Labor Prevention Act	H.R. 6210	March 11, 2020	Jim McGovern (D-MA)	87	Passed in the House (406–3)
116th Congress	Uyghur Forced Labor Prevention Act	S. 3471	March 12, 2020	Marco Rubio (R-FL)	33	Died in Committee
117th Congress	Uyghur Forced Labor Prevention Act	H.R. 1155	February 18, 2021	Jim McGovern (D-MA)	114	Passed in the House (428–1)
117th Congress	Uyghur Forced Labor Prevention Act	S. 65	January 27, 2021	Marco Rubio (R-FL)	54	Passed in the Senate (voice vote)
117th Congress	None	H.R. 6256	December 14, 2021	Jim McGovern (D-MA)	1	Signed by President

The bill was first introduced in the 116th Congress and on September 22, 2020, the bill passed the House by 406–3 votes. The three no votes were cast by Justin Amash, Warren Davidson, and Thomas Massie. The bill died in committee in the Senate.

The bill was reintroduced in the 117th Congress (S. 65) and unanimously passed the Senate on July 14, 2021. On December 8, 2021, a similar bill (H.R. 1155) passed the House by a 428–1 vote. Thomas Massie was the sole no vote. A revised version (H.R. 6256) that eliminated differences between the House and Senate bills passed the House on December 14, 2021, and the Senate on December 16, 2021, unanimously (100–0). It was signed into law by President Joe Biden on December 23, 2021.

== Purpose of legislation ==
The Uyghur Forced Labor Prevention Act made it U.S. policy to assume (a "rebuttable presumption") that all goods manufactured in Xinjiang are made with forced labor, unless the commissioner of U.S. Customs and Border Protection certifies that certain goods are known to not have been made with forced labor. The bill also calls for the President of the United States to impose sanctions on "any foreign person who 'knowingly engages'" in forced labor using minority Muslims. The bill further requires firms to disclose their dealings with Xinjiang. A list of Chinese companies that have relied on forced labor is mandated to be compiled.

== Enforcement ==
In September 2023, the Department of Homeland Security banned imports on three Xinjiang-based companies including the wool textile manufacturer Xinjiang Tianshan Wool Textile. In May 2024, the U.S. Department of Homeland Security banned imports from 26 Chinese textile companies under the UFLPA. In July 2024, the U.S. government added aluminum, seafood, and polyvinyl chloride to its priority list for UFLPA enforcement. In October 2024, the department also banned two Xinjiang-based companies including the steel maker Xinjiang Ba Yi Iron and Steel and an artificial sweetener maker.

In November 2024, textile supplier Esquel Group was banned from importing into the United States. The same month, the DHS added 29 PRC-based companies to the UFLPA Entity list, bringing the total to 107.

In January 2025, Huafu Fashion and subsidiaries of Zijin Mining were banned from importing to the United States.

In August 2025, steel, copper, lithium, caustic soda, and red dates were added as high-priority sectors for enforcement under the UFLPA. A press release from the DHS states that:

As of August 1, 2025, CBP has stopped more than 16,700 shipments valued at almost $3.7 billion for further examination under the UFLPA. Of these, more than 10,000 shipments valuing almost $900 million have been denied entry, keeping these suspected illicit goods out of U.S. markets.

In July 2026, the United States announced the addition of 43 Chinese companies to the UFLPA Entity List, the first under the Trump administration and the largest expansion since UFLPA came into effect.

== Reception ==
United States Commission on International Religious Freedom (USCIRF) commissioners Gary Bauer, James W. Carr, and Nury Turkel have called on Congress to pass the act. The AFL–CIO and Ethics & Religious Liberty Commission of the Southern Baptist Convention have supported the Uyghur Forced Labor Prevention Act. Sophie Richardson, then China director of Human Rights Watch, said in April 2020 that the bill was unprecedented and could put pressure on companies seen as having some sway with Chinese authorities.

The president of the American Apparel & Footwear Association said that blanket import bans on cotton or other products from Xinjiang from such legislation would "wreak havoc" on legitimate supply chains in the apparel industry because Xinjiang cotton exports are often intermingled with cotton from other countries and there is no available origin-tracing technology for cotton fibers. On September 22, 2020, the United States Chamber of Commerce issued a letter stating that the act "would prove ineffective and may hinder efforts to prevent human rights abuses." Major companies with supply chain ties to Xinjiang, including Apple Inc., Nike, Inc., and The Coca-Cola Company, have lobbied Congress to weaken the legislation and amend its provisions.

In January 2024, the United States House Select Committee on Strategic Competition between the United States and the Chinese Communist Party called for more aggressive enforcement of the UFLPA, including criminal prosecutions. In 2026, forensic verification firm Oritain that compliance with the UFLPA was hindered due to greater transshipment of Chinese goods and lack of transparency in supply chain data.

=== Academia ===
In 2023, academics Zhun Xu and Fangfei Lin called sanctions against China "baseless" and "imperialist responses to the crises of global capitalism." Lin wrote that the allegations of forced labor in Xinjiang cotton production made by the United States as grounds for sanctions are insufficiently supported. They cite the historic significance of Uyghur agricultural workers as a long-standing labor force for manual cotton harvesting and staffing companies' widespread recruitment of Uyghur workers due to lower travel costs and is therefore a case a market-driven employment and not forced labor. In their view, "[T]he labor demand of Uyghur seasonal cotton pickers in south Xinjiang is largely decided by its relatively low degree of agricultural capitalization, not due to the 'special treatment' towards labor migrants of a certain ethnic minority." Xu and Lin also contend that the U.S. sanctions implemented by the Act adversely impact Uyghur farmers.

=== Chinese government ===
The stance of the Chinese government and its ruling Chinese Communist Party on this as taken from People's Daily: "The U.S. act fabricates the so-called "forced labor" issue in China's Xinjiang and grossly interferes in China's internal affairs under the pretext of human rights," said a statement issued by the Foreign Affairs Committee of China's National People's Congress. "Should the United States choose to go down the wrong path, China will take resolute and forceful countermeasures," said the statement.

== See also ==
- Uyghur Human Rights Policy Act
- Tibet Policy and Support Act
- Hong Kong Human Rights and Democracy Act
- Magnitsky Act
- Mihrigul Tursun
- Xinjiang conflict
- Zhu Hailun
- United States sanctions against China
