= Han Fu =

Han Fu may refer to:

- Hanfu, historical Han Chinese clothing styles of China
  - Hanfu movement, a social movement seeking to revitalize traditional Chinese fashion
- Huafu Fashion, a listed Chinese color textile company.
- Han Fu (warlord), a politician and warlord during the late Eastern Han dynasty
- Han Fu (fictional), a fictional character in the historical novel Romance of the Three Kingdoms
- Fu (poetry), a form of literature commonly associated with Han dynasty
