= Rawak =

Rawak may refer to:

- Christine Rawak, American swimmer and swimming official
- Doris Ryffel-Rawak (born 1975), Uruguanian specialist in psychiatry and psychotherapy, expert in ADHD
- Rawak Stupa, Buddhist stupa in Xinjiang, China
- Rawak Harbour, Waigeo island, Indonesia
- Rawa Island
- Ros Ben Rawak, fictional character in Orient (1928 film)
