= Citizen Power Initiatives for China =

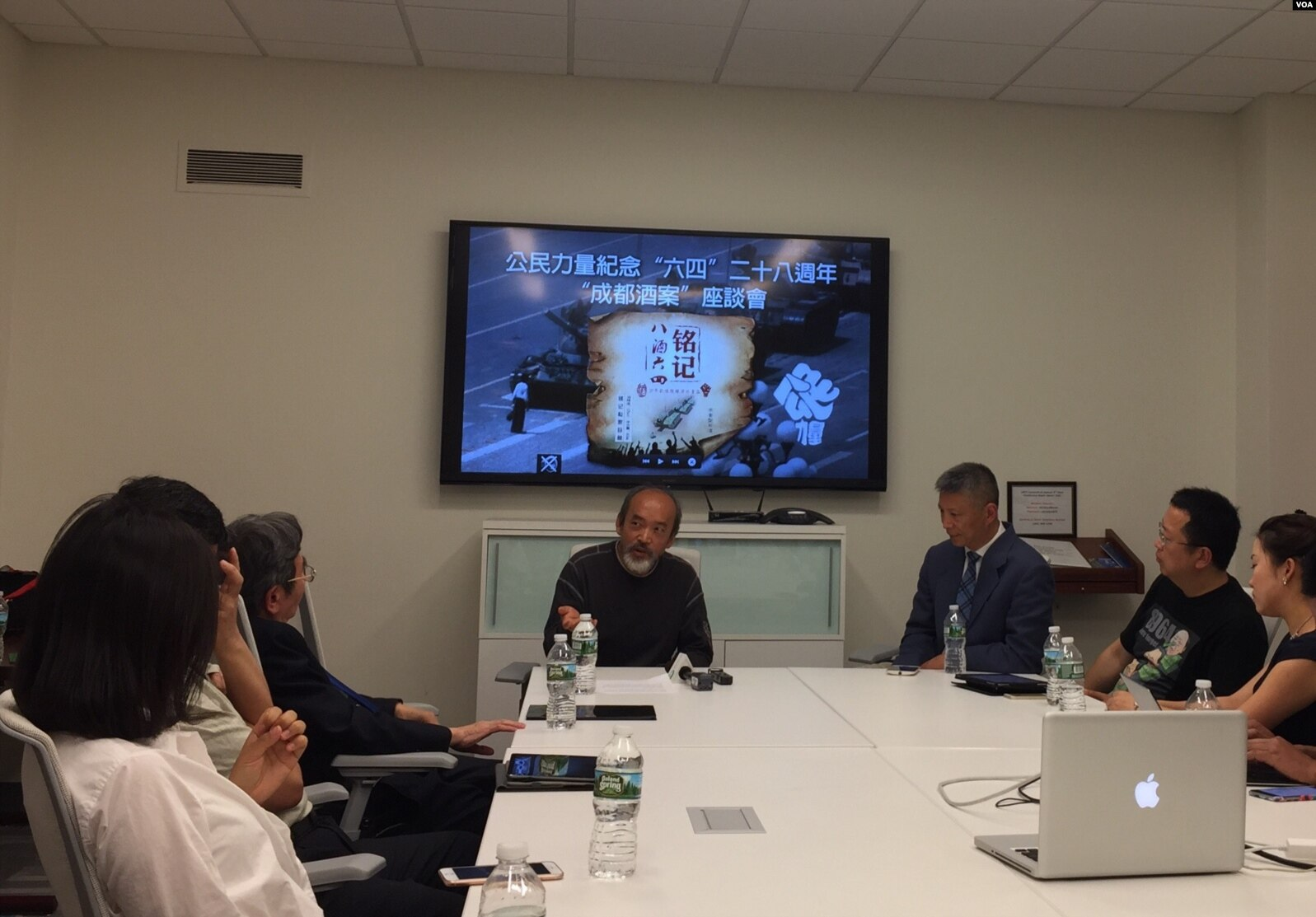
- Founded: 2008
- Founders: Yang Jianli
- Type: Non-profit NGO
- Purpose: Human Rights, Democratic Transition
- Headquarters: 415 2nd Street N.E. #100, Washington, D.C., U.S.
- Key people: David C. King, Chairman; Yang Jianli, President; Han Lianchao, Vice President
- Website: www.citizenpowerforchina.org
- Formerly called: Initiatives for China

Citizen Power Initiatives for China, previously known as Initiatives for China or Citizen Power for China, is pro-democracy movement and NGO committed for a peaceful transition to democracy in China through non-violent strategies based in Washington, D.C. The organization has been involved with works on U.S. Global Magnitsky Human Rights Accountability Act, the Australian Magnitsky Act, representing Liu Xiaobo at the Nobel Peace Prize ceremony, and 2014 Hong Kong protests.

== History ==
Initiatives for China was founded in 2008 by Dr. Yang Jianli after being released from Chinese prison for his political activities. The organization is a successor of the formal Foundation for China in the 21st Century, and it has continued foundation's tasks of Yibao Online Magazine and its Interethnic Interfaith Leadership Conference. Begin in 2018, the organization has officially adopted its new name Citizen Power Initiatives for China.

== Initiatives ==
=== 2010 Nobel Peace Prize ===
The organization's president, Dr. Yang Jianli represented Dr. Liu Xiaobo and Liu's wife Liu Xia (poet) to coordinate with Norway's Nobel Peace Prize Committee for the 2010 Nobel Ceremony. Dr. Yang Jianli and Nobel Peace Prize Committee decided on the Empty Chair symbol of the ceremony.

=== Interethnic Interfaith Leadership Conference ===
The Interethnic Interfaith Leadership Conferences began in 2000 in Boston, Massachusetts, with the guidance of the 14th Dalai Lama and support from National Endowment for Democracy. The Conference seeks to advance mutual understanding, respect, and cooperation among the diverse ethnic, religious, and regional groups who live under the direct rule of the Chinese government, and people living in Taiwan, Hong Kong and Macau, and to explore universal values, which will provide common ground for a common democratic future. The groups represented in the Conference include Han Chinese, Tibetans, Uyghurs, Mongolians, Christians, Falun Gong practitioners, Muslims, Buddhists, and people from Taiwan, Hong Kong and Macau.

Past Conferences have been held in strategic locations throughout the world: from Boston for the 1st, 2nd and 4th assemblies, to Hartford for the 3rd, to Washington, DC for the 5th and 10th, 13th, to California for the 6th and 7th, to Taiwan for the 8th and 9th, to Dharamsala, India for the 11th, and to Tokyo, Japan for the 12th.

=== Yibao ===
Formally known as ChinaEWeekly, Yibao was established in the 1990s, has published op-eds and news articles focused on the human rights and rule of law situation inside China. A number of journalists and contributors, including Chen Wei, Liu Xianbin, Chen Daojun from China has been arrested and sentenced by Chinese authority.
