= Tang Hsiang Chien =

Tang Hsiang Chien GBS, OBE, JP
- Born: 8 June 1923; Wuxi, Jiangsu, China
- Died: 10 March 2018 (aged 94); Hong Kong
- Education: University of Manchester; University of Illinois system
- Occupations: Hong Kong Affairs Advisor; Member of the Selection Committee; Member of the Preparatory Committee for the Hong Kong Special Administrative Region
- Spouse: Susan Yau Zeo-chi
- Children: Henry Tang; Mai Tang; Tom Tang
- Parent(s): Tang Tuen-Yuen; Wang Vam Han

Chinese name
- Chinese: 唐翔千
Transcriptions
Standard Mandarin
- Hanyu Pinyin: Táng Xiángqiān
Yue: Cantonese
- Jyutping: tong^{4} coeng^{4}cin^{1}

Tang Hsiang-chien, GBS, OBE, JP (Chinese: 唐翔千, 8 June 1923 – 10 March 2018) was a Hong Kong industrialist.

== Personal ==
Tang was born in Wuxi, Jiangsu Province in what was then the Republic of China. His grandfather Tang Xiangting (唐驤庭) had founded a textile company, which was expanded by his father Tang Junyuan (唐君遠).

His son Henry Tang Ying Yen was Financial Secretary of Hong Kong and a candidate for Chief Executive in 2012.

== Business career ==
Tang graduated from Utopia University in Shanghai in 1945, then moved on to University of Manchester in 1947 and received a master's degree from Illinois State University in 1948. He moved and relocated his business interests to Hong Kong in 1950.

His businesses prospered in Hong Kong, mostly in textiles (Peninsula Knitters and Soco Textiles), but was involved in printed circuit-boards with the establishment of Meadville Holdings (sold to TTM Technologies in 2009). After 1989, he showed commitment to the emerging business environment of China, amassing an estimated net worth of US$1.6 billion, and earning him membership of the Standing Committee of the 7–9th CPPCC National Committee.

== Political and non-business roles ==
Tang was a political insider with lead positions on a number of boards and committees. He had an important role in Hong Kong's transfer of power from the UK to China in the years leading up to 1997. His business positions included managing director of Soco Textiles, chairman of Peninsula Knitters, general manager of Xinjiang Tianshan Wool Tex Stock Company and general manager of Shanghai United Woolentex Group and Guandong Lianfa Woolen Fabric Company, with associated ownership stakes.

His non-business positions included chairman of the Hong Kong Textile Trade Union, member of the Hong Kong Trade Development Council and vice-chairman of the Hong Kong General Chamber of Commerce. During the transfer of Hong Kong to China, he served on the PRC Consultative Committee on Basic Law, on the first group of Hong Kong Affairs Advisors, on the Preparatory Committee for Hong Kong SAR and on the Selection Committee for the first Hong Kong SAR government.

== Death ==
Tang died on 10 March 2018, aged 94 years, peacefully at his home in Hong Kong.

== Family ==
Tang was married to Susan Tang Yew Zoe-chi, who survived him. The couple had four children, Henry, Sandys, Mai and Tom.
