= Sampul tapestry =

Ancient woolen wall-hanging found in Xinjiang, China

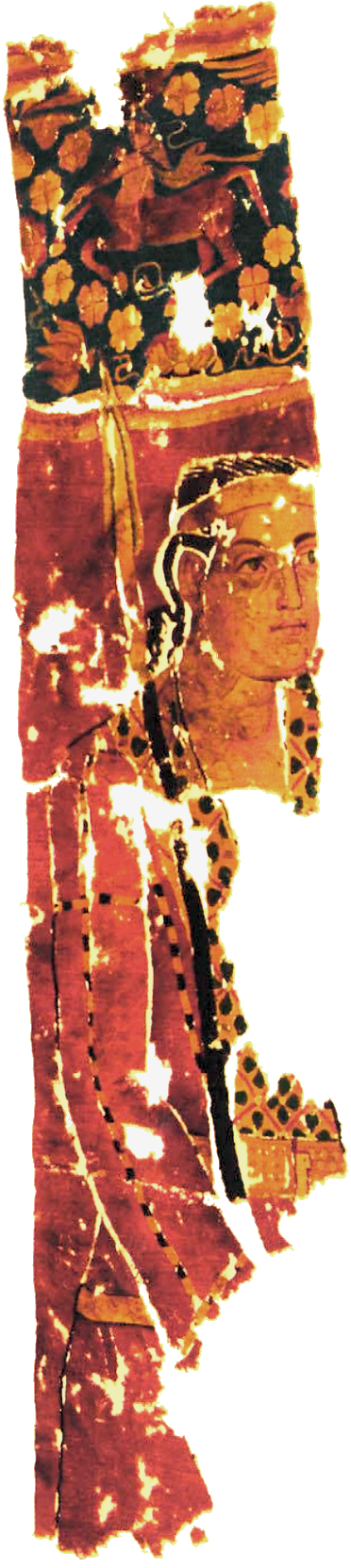
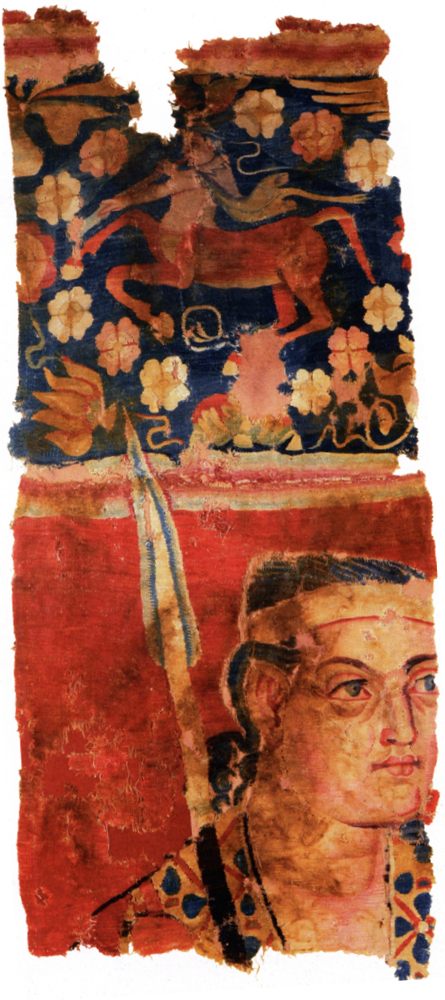
- Full length Detail Probable Yuezhi soldier in red jacket and trousers, in the Sampul tapestry. Embroidered in Hellenistic style, with motif of a centaur, 1st century AD, Sampul, Ürümqi Xinjiang Region Museum.
- Material: Embroided tapestry
- Created: 1st century AD
- Discovered: Sampul, 37.020199°N 80.113078°E

Sampul tapestry is an ancient woolen wall-hanging found at the Tarim Basin settlement of Sampul in Lop County, Hotan Prefecture, Xinjiang, China, close to the ancient city of Khotan. The object has many Hellenistic period features, including a Greek centaur and diadem, linking it to the Greco-Bactrian Kingdom (formed after the conquest of the Achaemenid Empire by Alexander the Great of Macedon and establishment of the Seleucid Empire). It may represent a Yuezhi soldier, in red jacket and trousers, from the 1st century CE. Alternatively, the soldier (king) is possibly a Greco-Bactrian, an Hellenized Saka or a Greco-Saka military aristocrat. The man's head features (cheek, mouth, blue eyes, nose, hairband) and the spear representation are modeled similarly with the depiction of Alexander the Great on a medallion found from Roman Egypt (215-243 AD) and could represent the king. Overall, the Sampul tapestry belongs to the Greco-Bactrian culture.

== Description ==
The full tapestry is 48 cm wide and 230 cm long. The centaur fragment is 45 cm by 55 cm, warrior's face fragment is 48 cm by 52 cm. The recovered tapestry only constitutes the left decorative border of what would be a much bigger wall hanging.

Made of wool, it comprises 24 threads of various colours.

The tapestry depicts a man with Caucasoid features, (including blue eyes), and a centaur. If lost fabric is accounted for, the soldier would be about six times as tall as the centaur. The subject is identified as a warrior by the spear he is holding in his hand as well as a dagger tucked on his waist. He wears a tunic with rosette motifs. His headband could be a diadem, a symbol of kingship in the Hellenistic world – and represented on Macedonian and other ancient Greek coinage.

The centaur is playing a horn (salpinx) while wearing a cape and a hood. Surrounding him is a diamond-shaped floral ornament. His cape is made of the Nemean lion skin and the centaur is a reference to both Heracles and Chiron (the mentor of Achilles).

Due to heavy looting at the location, the dating of the material is uncertain. It has been assigned dates from the 3rd century BC to the 4th century AD.

== Discovery ==
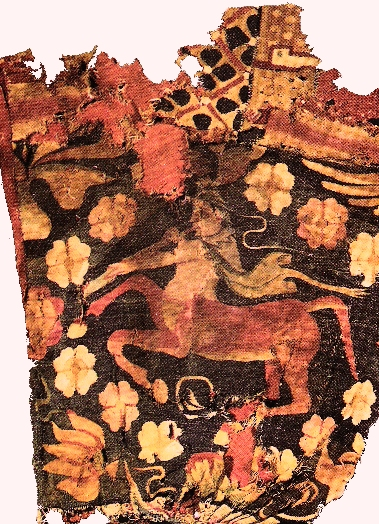
The centaur, with floral decorations.

The tapestry was excavated in 1983–1984 at an ancient burial ground in Sampul (Shanpula), 30 km east of Hotan (Khotan), in the Tarim Basin.

The tapestry was, curiously, fashioned into a pair of man's trousers (all the other trousers found in Sampul had no decoration).

== Origin ==
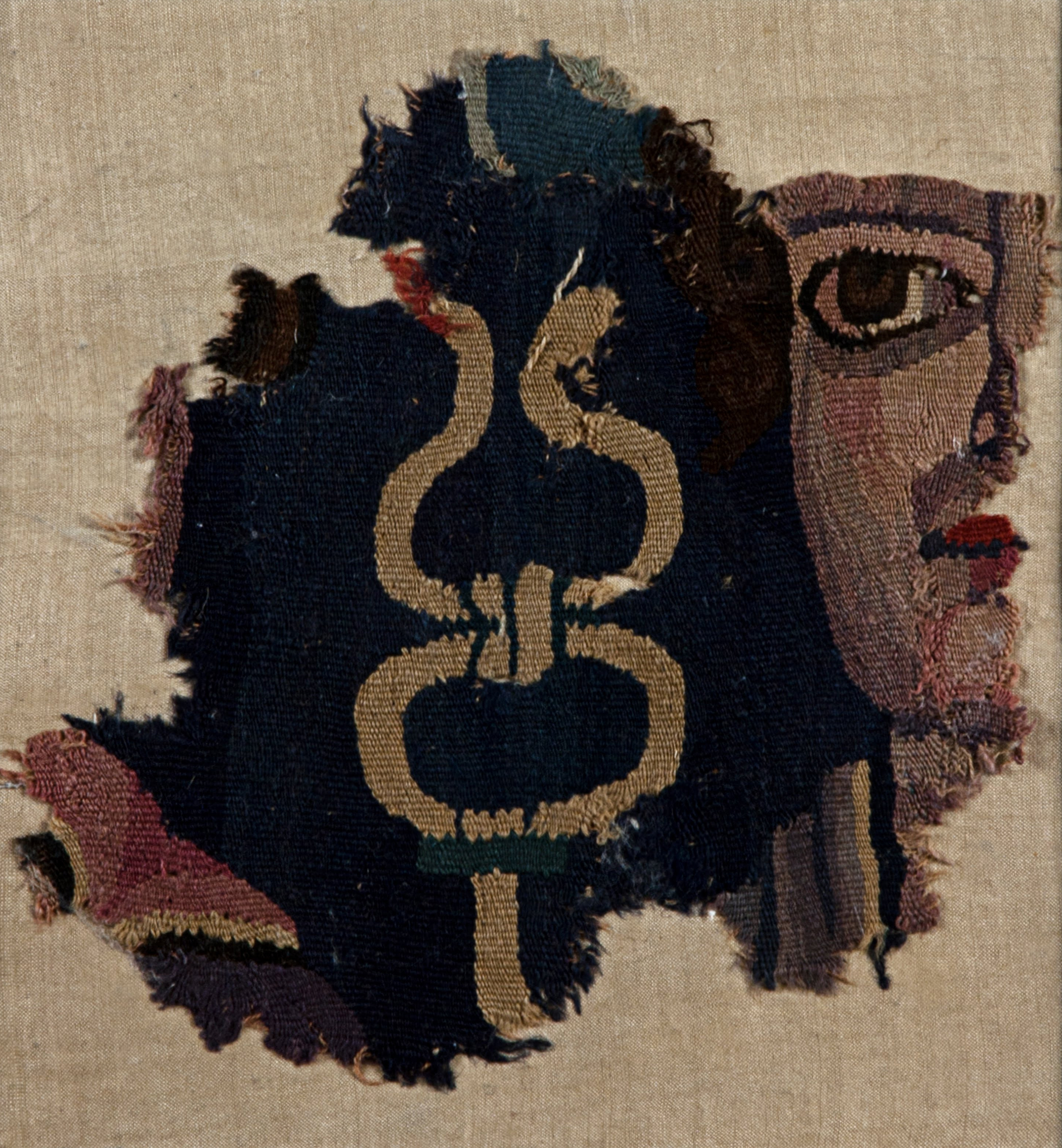
Tapestry with head of Hermes and his staff caduceus, discovered by Aurel Stein in Loulan Kingdom.

It is uncertain where the tapestry was made, although the Greco-Bactrian Kingdom in Central Asia has been suggested to be a possibility. The technique used for the tapestry, with more than 24 threads of different colours, is a typically Western one. The centaur's cape and hood are a central Asian modification of the Greek motif. The fact that he plays a horn also distinguishes him from the Greek prototypes. Flower diamond motif on the warrior's lapel is of central Asian origin. Certain motifs, particularly the animal head on the soldier's dagger, suggest that the tapestry originated in the kingdom of Parthia in northern Iran.

Rome has also been proposed as a possible source. Another suggestion is that it is locally made as Tang annal New Book of Tang mentioned that local people of Khotan were good at textile and tapestry work when Emperor Wu of Han (r. 141-87 BC) opened the Silk Road to Khotan during the first century BC. The tapestry may have been made roughly a century before the Han Chinese conquest of the Tarim Basin under Wudi. Hellenistic tapestries have also been found in Loulan by Aurel Stein, indicating a cultural link between Loulan and Khotan.

== Significance ==
The existence of this tapestry tends to suggest that contacts between the Hellenistic kingdoms of Central Asia and the Tarim Basin, at the edge of the Chinese world, occurred from around the 3rd century BC.

== Exhibition history ==
The tapestry is on permanent display in the Xinjiang Museum, Ürümqi, China.

Centaur and head fragments of the tapestry have been a part of a major exhibition China: Dawn of a Golden Age, 200–750 AD, held at the Metropolitan Museum of Art, New York, from 12 October 2004 to 23 January 2005.

From 18 February to 5 June 2011, they were displayed at the Penn Museum, Philadelphia, in exhibition Secrets of the Silk Road.

== See also ==
- Byzantine silk
- Coptic textiles
- Samite
- Sichuan embroidery
- Silk Road
- Sogdian textiles
- Tocharian clothing
- Ancient Arts of Central Asia
