= Tianshan Wool Textile =

Chinese textile company

Xinjiang Tianshan Wool Textile Company
- Company type: Public
- Industry: production of cashmere and wool sweaters
- Founded: 1980
- Headquarters: Urumqi, Xinjiang, China
- Key people: President: Liu Zhongbin (as of 2024)
- Website: www.chinatianshan.com

Xinjiang Tianshan Wool Textile Company (Chinese: 新疆天山毛纺织股份有限公司, 天山纺织), or Tianshan Wool Textile (SZSE: 000813), established in 1980 and previously named Xinjiang Tianshan Wool Tex Company, is a Chinese company with foreign joint venture primarily engaged in the production of cashmere and wool sweaters. It is among the first four foreign direct investments sanctioned during the initial phase of China's reform and opening up.

== History ==
In 1980, the company was founded by Xinjiang Urumqi Woolen Textile Factory and Hong Kong Tianshan Woolen Textile Company Limited as a joint venture with limited liability, with a registered capital of 8 million U.S. dollars, which is the first Sino-foreign joint venture in the textile industry. Then President of the Federation of Hong Kong Industries, Tang Hsiang Chien, invested in Tianshan Wool Textile and became the Chairman of the Board. In 1995, Xinjiang Tianshan Woolen Textile Co., Ltd. underwent restructuring into a joint stock limited company and adopted its current name, subsequently being listed on the stock market on May 19, 1998. Following 2013, mining was incorporated into its business operations, and the original woolen textile industry has largely achieved modernized and mechanized manufacturing. In September 2023, the company was recognized as one of the top 200 Chinese manufacturing enterprises based on comprehensive strength. That same year, the company won the 6th Xinjiang Government Quality Award.

=== U.S. restrictions ===
In September 2023, the company was put under the Uyghur Forced Labor Prevention Act Entity List by the U.S. government. According to the U.S. Department of Homeland Security, the company is involved with business practices involving Uyghur minorities and persecuted groups by the Chinese government.

According to the company's president Liu Zhongbin in December 2024, employees from ethnic minorities only composed of 22 percent of their workforce.
