= Sampul =

Sampul سامپۇل بازىرى 山普鲁镇 Shanpulu
- Town
- Location in Xinjiang Sampul (China) Sampul (West and Central Asia)
- Coordinates: 37°01′16″N 80°06′42″E
- Country: China
- Autonomous Region: Xinjiang
- Prefecture: Hotan
- County: Lop (Luopu)
- Seat: Xianbaibazha (先拜巴扎村)
- Villages: 31

Area
  - Total: 56.3 km^{2} (21.7 sq mi)

Population (2010)
  - Total: 29,509
  - Density: 524/km^{2} (1,360/sq mi)

Ethnic groups
  - Major ethnic group: Uyghur
- Time zone: UTC+8 (China Standard)

Sampul (Shanpulu; سامپۇل بازىرى; simplified Chinese: 山普鲁镇; traditional Chinese: 山普魯鎮, formerly 山普鲁乡 / 山普魯鄉) is a town in Lop County (Luopu), Hotan Prefecture, Xinjiang, China.

== History ==
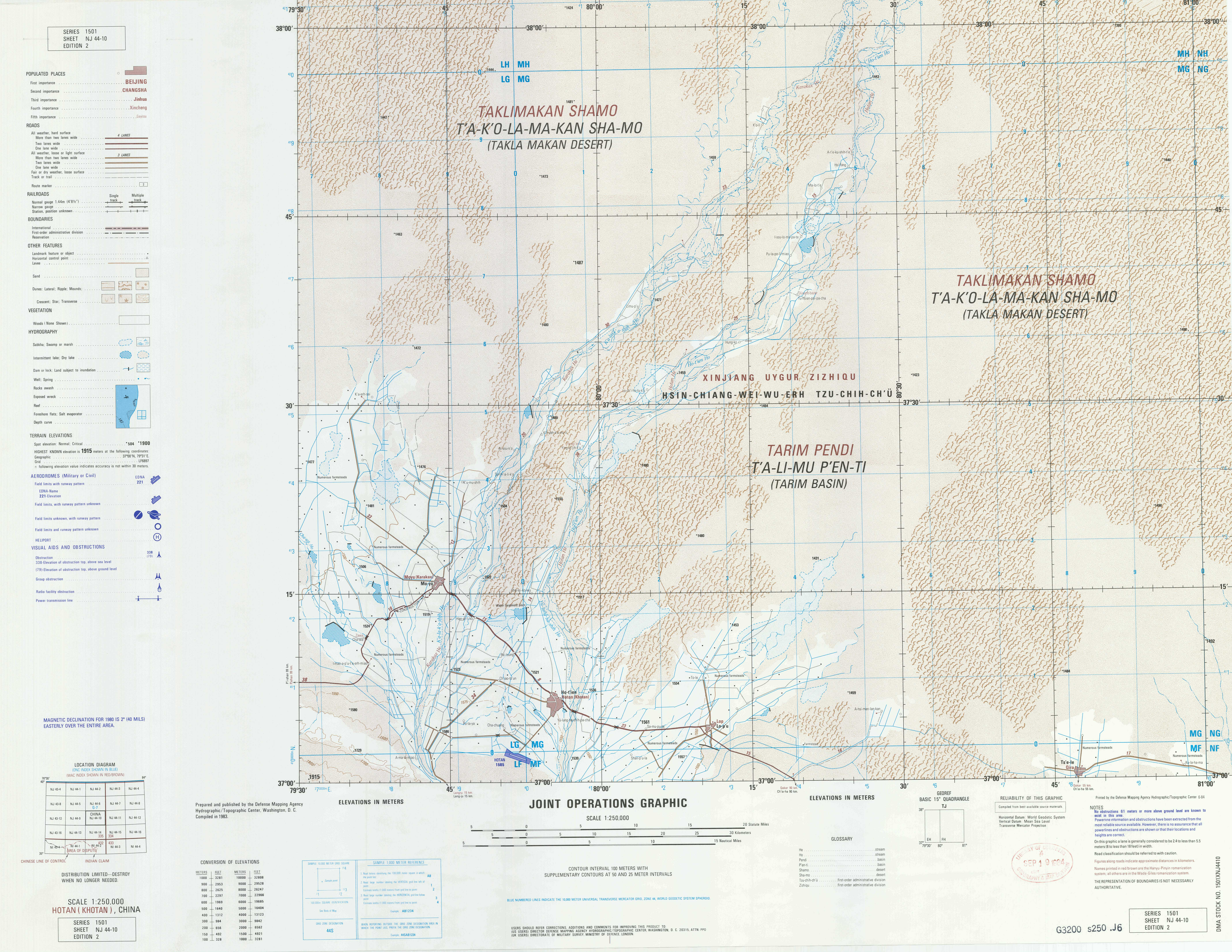
Map of the region including Sampul (labeled as Shan-p'u-la) (DMA, 1983)

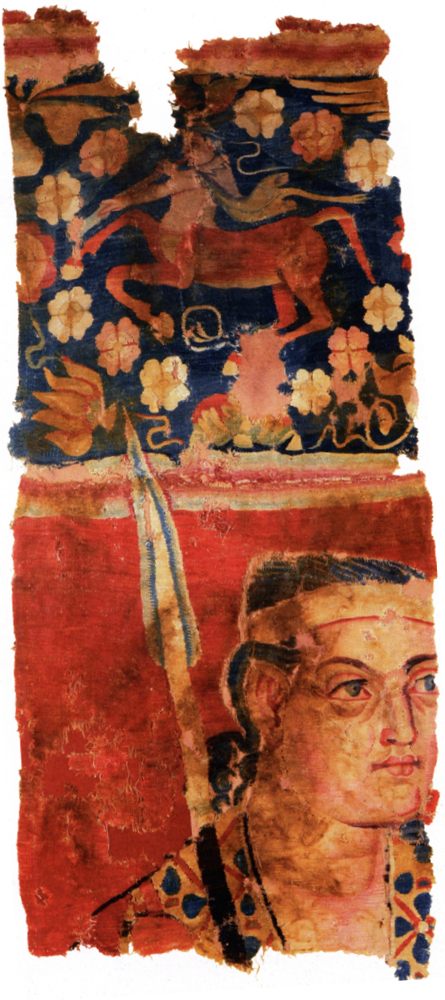
Sampul tapestry, warrior

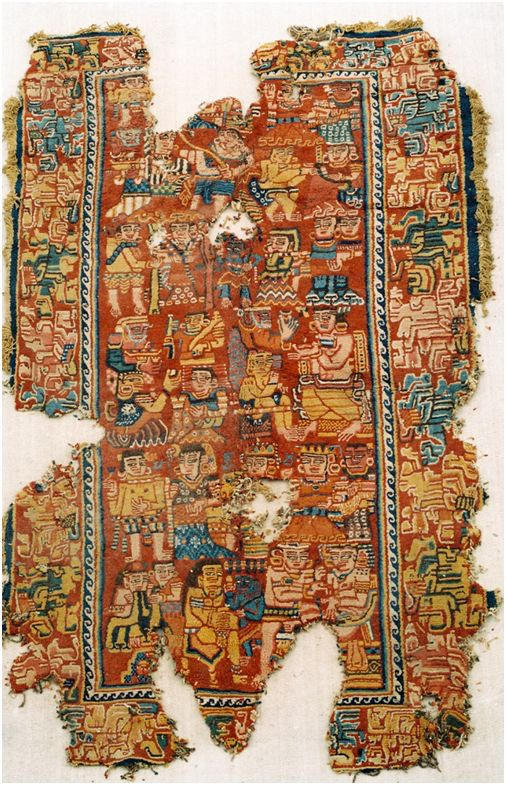
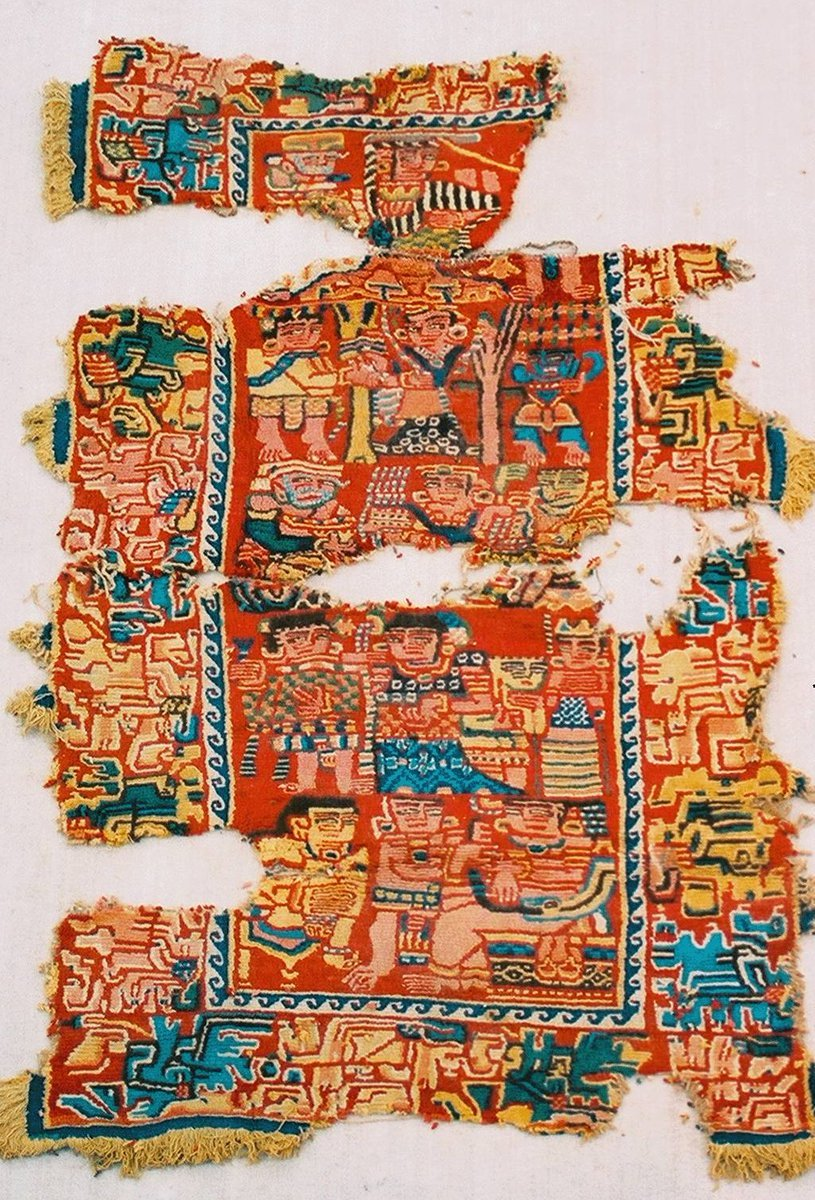
Lop carpets discovered in Sampul.

Local inhabitants at Sampul cemetery around 14 km (8.7 mi) where art such as the Sampul tapestry has been found, buried their dead from roughly 217 BCE to 283 CE. The analysis of mtDNA haplogroup distribution showed that the Sampula inhabitants had a large mixture of East Asian, Persian and European characteristics. According to Chengzhi et al. (2007), analysis of maternal mitochondrial DNA of the human remains has revealed genetic affinities at the maternal side to Ossetians and Iranians, an Eastern-Mediterranean paternal lineage. (Note: From historical accounts it is known that Alexander the Great, who married a Sogdian woman from Bactria named Roxana, encouraged his soldiers and generals to marry local women; consequentially the later kings of the Seleucid Empire and Greco-Bactrian Kingdom had a mixed Persian-Greek ethnic background. Lucas Christopoulos writes : "The kings (or soldiers) of the Sampul cemetery came from various origins, composing as they did a homogeneous army made of Hellenized Persians, western Scythians, or Sacae Iranians from their mother's side, just as were most of the second generation of Greeks colonists living in the Seleucid Empire. Most of the soldiers of Alexander the Great who stayed in Persia, India and central Asia had married local women, thus their leading generals were mostly Greeks from their father's side or had Greco-Macedonian grandfathers. Antiochos had a Persian mother, and all the later Indo-Greeks or Greco-Bactrians were revered in the population as locals, as they used both Greek and Bactrian scripts on their coins and worshipped the local gods. The DNA testing of the Sampul cemetery shows that the occupants had maternal origins in the eastern part of the Mediterranean".)

The Sampul tapestry was discovered in Sampul in the mid-1980s.

On October 21, 2014, Sampul township (山普鲁乡) disestablished and Sampul town (山普鲁镇) was created.

In 2016–17, five villages were added to Sampul.

On the afternoon of April 7, 2017, the XUAR Judiciary Office's de-extremization (去极端化) propaganda team began three days of de-extremization lectures in the county including visits in Sampul.

On December 13, 2019, the body of a 5 year old Uyghur boy was found in snow in a stream in Sampul, and viral video of the discovery led to international attention.

== Administrative divisions ==
As of 2018, Sampul included thirty-one villages (Mandarin Chinese Hanyu Pinyin-derived names, except where Uyghur is provided):

- Arimaili (阿日买里村)
- Xianbaibazha (先拜巴扎村)
- Köchken (Kuoqikan, Kuoqikancun; كۆچكەن كەنتى / 阔其坎村) 37°01′55″N 080°06′57″E
- Lengger (Langan, Langancun; لەڭگەر كەنتى / 兰干村) 37°00′41″N 080°08′04″E
- Kilente (Kelante, Kelantecun; كىلەنتە كەنتى / 克兰特村) 37°01′08″N 080°07′17″E
- Aydingköl (Ayidingkule, Ayiding Kulecun; ئايدىڭكۆل كەنتى / 阿依丁库勒村) 37°02′09″N 080°09′01″E
- Bash medris (Bashi'airike, Bashi Airikecun; باش مەدرىس كەنتى / 巴什艾日克村, or Bashi'akemaidirisi 巴什阿克买迪日斯村) 37°23′45″N 079°32′06″E
- Ayagh medris (Ayake'airike; ئاياغ مەدرىس كەنتى / 阿亚克艾日克村, or Ayake'akemaidirisi, Ayake Akemai Dirisicun 阿亚克阿克买迪日斯村) 37°01′20″N 080°08′28″E
- Chaqpi mark (Qiakemake, Qiake Makecun; چاقپى مارك كەنتى / 恰克玛克村) 37°01′32″N 080°07′47″E
- Jay'ëriq (Jiayi'airike, Jiayi Airikecun; جايئېرىق كەنتى / 加依艾日克村) 37°00′29″N 080°07′50″E
- Qurbagh (Ku'erbage, Ku'er Bagecun; چاقپى مارك كەنتى / 库尔巴格村) 37°01′43″N 080°09′07″E
- Qotaz (Kuotazilangan; قوتاز كەنتى / 阔塔孜兰干村)
- Ildam (Yiledamu, Yiledamucun; ئىلدام كەنتى / 依勒达木村) 37°00′44″N 080°04′56″E
- Bashikeyikuo (巴什克依阔村)
- Qumbagh (Kumubage, Kumu Bagecun; قۇمباغ كەنتى / 库木巴格村) 37°00′19″N 080°03′33″E
- Sëriq (Serike; سېرىق كەنتى / 色日克村)
- Qarangghuyar (Karangguya, Karang Guyacun; قاراڭغۇيار كەنتى / 喀让古亚村) 36°59′50″N 080°04′08″E
- Ayagh qiyqu (Ayagekeyikuo; ئاياغ قىيقۇ كەنتى / 阿亚格克依阔村)
- Kalayangtake (Kalayang Takecun; 喀拉央塔克村) 36°57′32″N 079°55′18″E
- Bashbiz (Bashibizili, Bashibizilicun; باشبىز كەنتى / 巴什比孜里村) 36°58′13″N 079°56′01″E
- Otturabiz (Outulabizili, Outula Bizilicun; ئوتتۇرابىز كەنتى / 欧吐拉比孜里村) 36°59′05″N 079°56′51″E
- Ayagh biz (Ayagebizili; ئاياغ بىز كەنتى / 阿亚格比孜里村)
- Karki (Kalake'er; قارقىي كەنت / 喀拉克尔村)
- Yëngi lengger (Yinglangan; يېڭى لەڭگەر كەنتى / 英兰干村)
- Bositankule (博斯坦库勒村)
- Yingbage (英巴格村)
- Bulake (布拉克村)
- Bashikule (巴什库勒村)
- Ayagekelante (阿亚格克兰特村)
- Nu'erluke (努尔鲁克村)
- Kazimileke (喀孜米勒克村)

In 2009, villages in Sampul township included:

- Arimaili (阿日买里村), Xianbaibazha (先拜巴扎村), Kuoqikan (阔其坎村), Langan (兰干村), Kelante (克兰特村), Ayidingkule (阿依丁库勒村), Bashi'akemaidirisi (巴什阿克买迪日斯村), Ayake'akemaidirisi (阿亚克阿克买迪日斯村), Qiakemake (恰克玛克村), Jiayi'airike (加依艾日克村), Ku'erbage (库尔巴格村), Kuotazilangan (阔塔孜兰干村), Yiledamu (依勒达木村), Bashikeyikuo (巴什克依阔村), Kumubage (库木巴格村), Serike (色日克村), Karangguya (喀让古亚村), Ayagekeyikuo (阿亚格克依阔村), Kalayangtake (喀拉央塔克村), Bashibizili (巴什比孜里村), Outulabizili (欧吐拉比孜里村), Ayagebizili (阿亚格比孜里村), Kalake'er (喀拉克尔村), Yinglangan (英兰干村), Bositankule (博斯坦库勒村), Yingbage (英巴格村)

== Demographics ==
Historical population
Year	Pop.	±% p.a.
2000	24,496	—
2010	29,509	+1.88%

== See also ==
- List of township-level divisions of Xinjiang
