= Lop County =

Lop County لوپ ناھىيىسى (Uyghur) 洛浦县 (Chinese) Luopu, Lo-p'u
- County
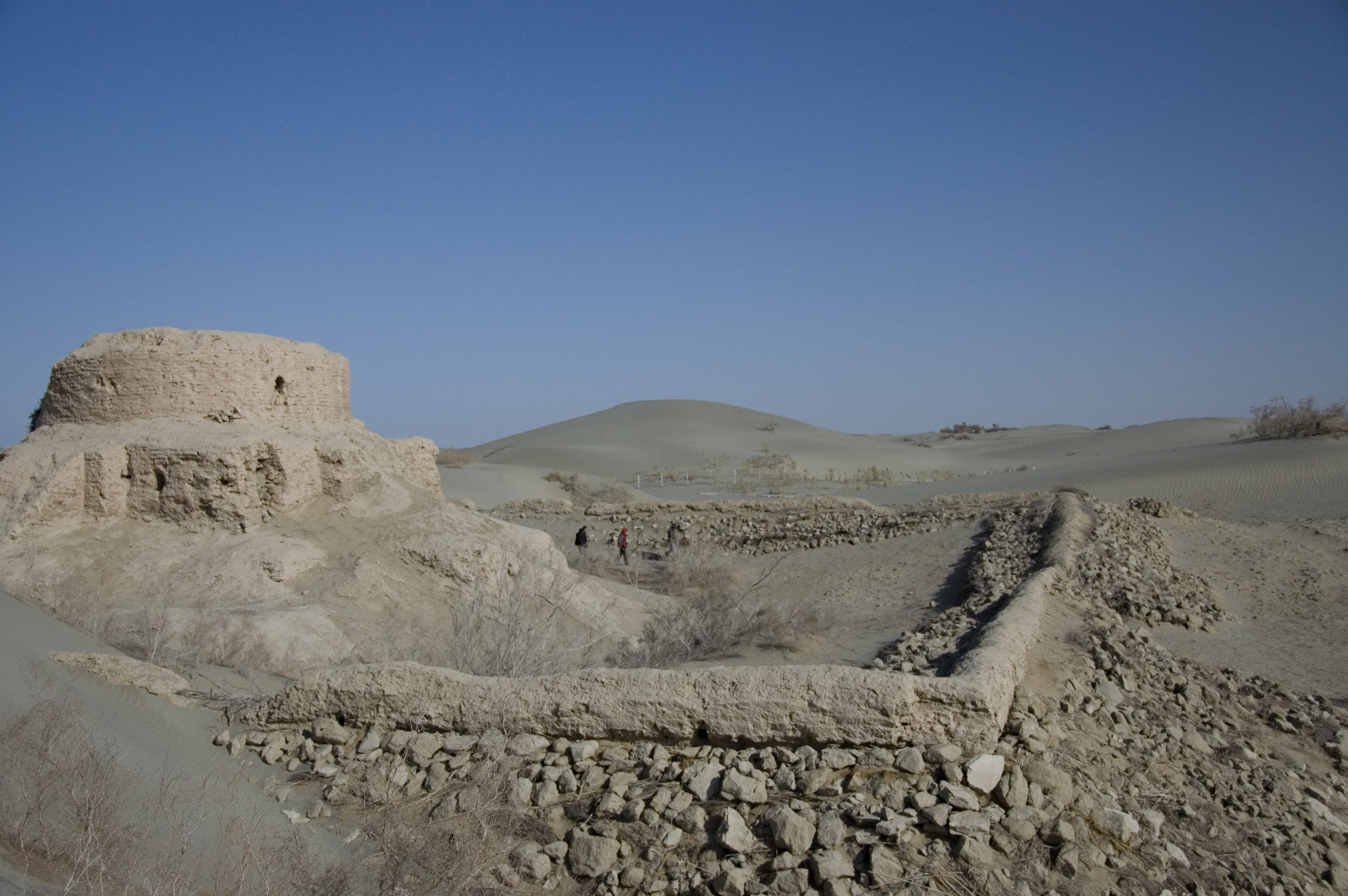
- Rawak Stupa in the Taklamakan Desert

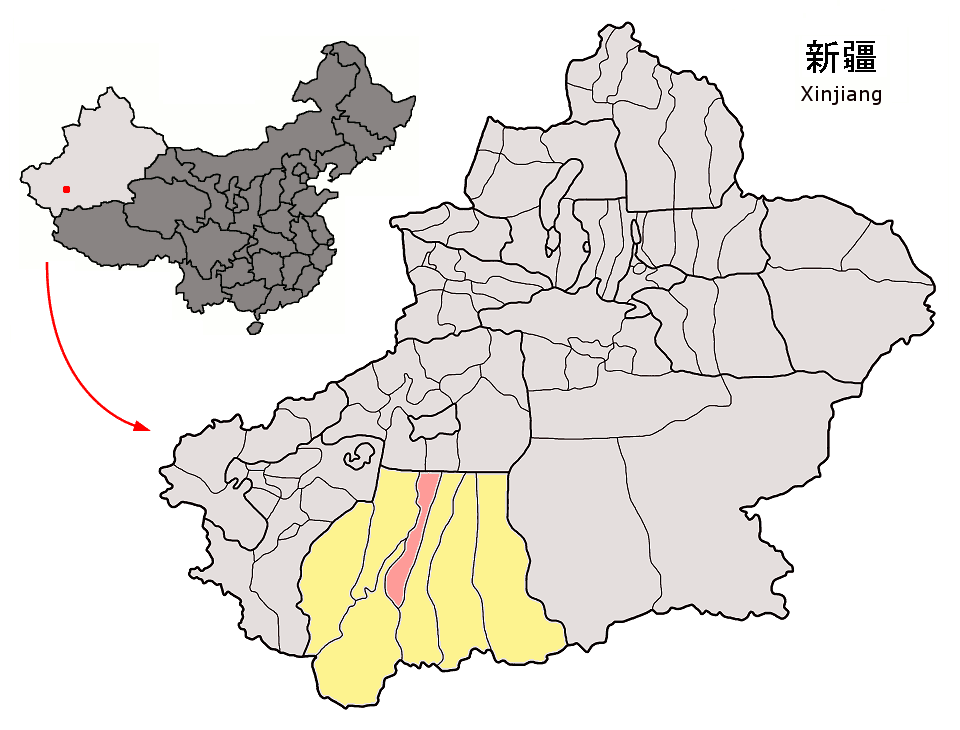
- Location of Lop County (red) within Hotan Prefecture (yellow) and Xinjiang

- Location of the seat in Xinjiang Lop (Xinjiang) Lop (China)
- Coordinates: 37.074°N 80.189°E
- Country: China
- Autonomous region: Xinjiang
- Prefecture: Hotan
- County seat: Lop Town

Area
  - Total: 14,287 km^{2} (5,516 sq mi)

Population (2020)
  - Total: 286,900
  - Density: 20.08/km^{2} (52.01/sq mi)

Ethnic groups
  - Major ethnic groups: Uyghur
- Time zone: UTC+8 (China Standard (Note: Locals in Xinjiang frequently observe UTC+6 (Xinjiang Time), 2 hours behind Beijing.))
- Postal code: 848200
- Website: www.xjlpx.gov.cn (in Chinese)

Lop County

Uyghur name
- Uyghur: لوپ ناھىيىسى
Transcriptions
- Latin Yëziqi: Lop Nahiyisi
- Yengi Yeziⱪ: Lop Naⱨiyisi
- SASM/GNC: Lop Nahiyisi
- Siril Yëziqi: Лоп Наһийиси

Chinese name
- Simplified Chinese: 洛浦县
- Traditional Chinese: 洛浦縣
Transcriptions
Standard Mandarin
- Hanyu Pinyin: Luòpǔ Xiàn
- Wade–Giles: Lo⁴-pʻu³ Hsien⁴

Lop County ( Uyghur: لوپ ناھىيىسى), also Luopu (from Mandarin Chinese), is a county in Hotan Prefecture, in the southwest of the Xinjiang Uyghur Autonomous Region, China. Almost all the residents of the county are Uyghur and live around oases situated between the desolate Taklamakan Desert and Kunlun Mountains. The county is bordered to the north by Aksu and Awat County in Aksu Prefecture, to the east by Qira/Chira County, to the northwest by Karakax County, to the west by Hotan (Khotan) and to the south and west by Hotan County.

== History ==
Local inhabitants at Sampul cemetery (Shanpula; سامپۇل / 山普拉) around 14 km (8.7 mi) where art such as the Sampul tapestry has been found, buried their dead from roughly 217 BCE to 283 CE. The analysis of mtDNA haplogroup distribution showed that the Sampula inhabitants had a large mixture of East Asian, West-Asian and European characteristics. According to Chengzhi et al. (2007), analysis of maternal mitochondrial DNA of the human remains has revealed genetic affinities at the maternal side to Ossetians and Iranians, an Eastern-Mediterranean paternal lineage. (Note: From historical accounts it is known that Alexander the Great, who married a Sogdian woman from Bactria named Roxana, encouraged his soldiers and generals to marry local women; consequentially the later kings of the Seleucid Empire and Greco-Bactrian Kingdom had a mixed Persian-Greek ethnic background. Lucas Christopoulos writes : "The kings (or soldiers) of the Sampul cemetery came from various origins, composing as they did a homogeneous army made of Hellenized Persians, western Scythians, or Sacae Iranians from their mother's side, just as were most of the second generation of Greeks colonists living in the Seleucid Empire. Most of the soldiers of Alexander the Great who stayed in Persia, India and central Asia had married local women, thus their leading generals were mostly Greeks from their father's side or had Greco-Macedonian grandfathers. Antiochos had a Persian mother, and all the later Indo-Greeks or Greco-Bactrians were revered in the population as locals, as they used both Greek and Bactrian scripts on their coins and worshipped the local gods. The DNA testing of the Sampul cemetery shows that the occupants had maternal origins in the eastern part of the Mediterranean".)

Archaeologist Aurel Stein visited Rawak Stupa during his First Central Asian expedition in April 1901.

Lop County was established in August 1902.

In May 1956, Abdimit, a Sufi shaykh from Khotan, attempted to incite insurrection in the county which was put down by armed troops and police forces.

The Sampul tapestry was discovered in Sampul in the mid-1980s.

Between August 1986 and May 1987, an outbreak of viral hepatitis occurred in Dol (Duolu) township resulting in 9,371 cases of acute hepatitis and 47 deaths.

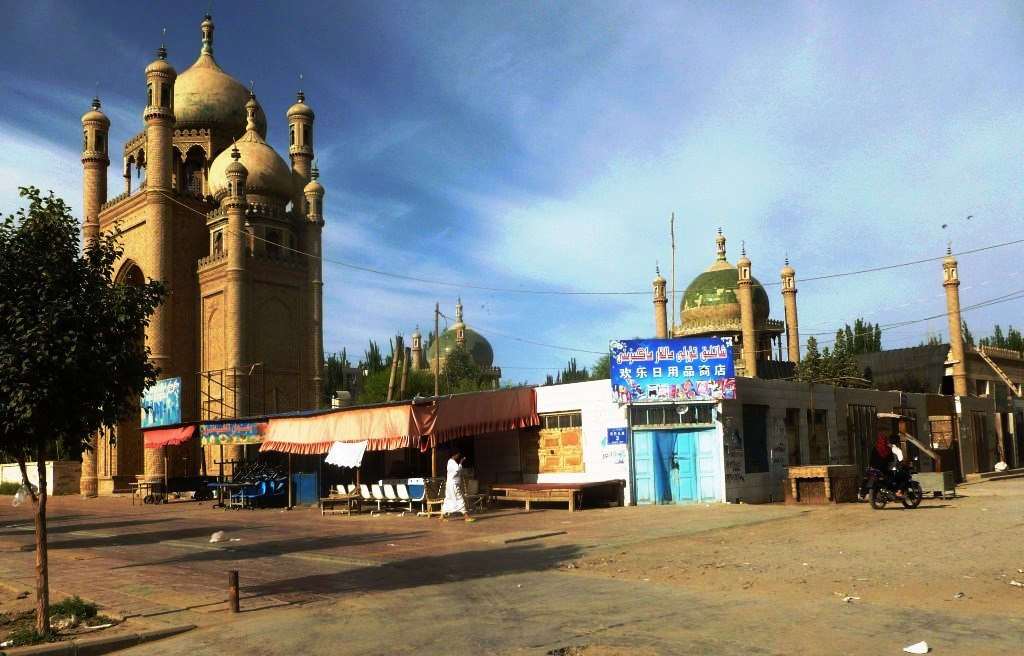
Mosque in Lop (2011).

In 2004, an official who declined to be identified from the Lop county religious affairs committee told Radio Free Asia that fasting was not allowed during Ramadan, and that high school students in his town would be given candy before they left school at 4:30 p.m.. The official confirmed reports that Chinese authorities were continuing a program of heavy religious control and censorship.

On July 11, 2006, the townships of Jiya and Yurungqash (Yulongkashi), then part of Lop County, were transferred to Hotan City.

According to the World Uyghur Congress and Radio Free Asia, in the lead-up to the 2008 Beijing Olympics, authorities in Lop county forced women to remove head coverings in a stated effort to promote "women for the new era".

On October 21, 2014, Sampul township was re-designated as a town.

At 9 PM on May 11 and 8:15 AM on May 12, 2015, two suicide bombings at a security checkpoint station in the county resulted in six deaths and four injured.

On November 20, 2016, Hanggiya (Hanggui) was changed from a township into a town.

Marriages between Uyghurs and Han Chinese persons are encouraged with subsidies by the government. In October 2017, the marriage of a Han Chinese man from Henan Province to a Uyghur woman from the county was celebrated on the county's social media page.

Hetian Haolin Hair Accessories, a company first registered at the Lop County Beijing Industrial Park (洛浦县北京工业园区) in 2018, employed 5,000 new workers in its first year of business, making 159 international shipments. The Lop County Beijing Industrial Park has been associated with re-education camp photographs.

According to The Guardian, as of early 2019, there were eight re-education camps, officially labelled "vocational training centres", in the county.

To increase aid delivery to Xinjiang, places in Xinjiang are paired with other areas of China which can provide aid. Tianjin and Hotan are paired in this program. In July 2019, football equipment and training materials with pictures and videos to local youth players and football coaches were provided for primary school students in the county.

On September 14, 2020, the U.S. Department of Homeland Security blocked imports of products from four entities in Xinjiang including all products made with labor from the Lop County No. 4 Vocational Skills Education and Training Center and hair products made in the Lop County Hair Product Industrial Park.

== Geography ==
The northern part of Lop County is made up of sand dunes and ends in a straight line drawn in the Taklamakan Desert that forms part of the boundary between Hotan Prefecture and Aksu Prefecture. The Hotan River forms the boundary with Karakax County. The National Closed Sandified Land Protected Area is located in Northern Hanggiya Township.

The towns and townships are clustered around the oases around the highways in the southern part of the county.

The southern tip of the county reaches the Kunlun Mountains. At 5,466 m (17,933 ft) above sea level, the highest point in the county is Tekiliktag (Tiekelekeshan, T'ieh-k'o-li-k'o Shan; تەكىلىكتاغ / 铁克勒克山).

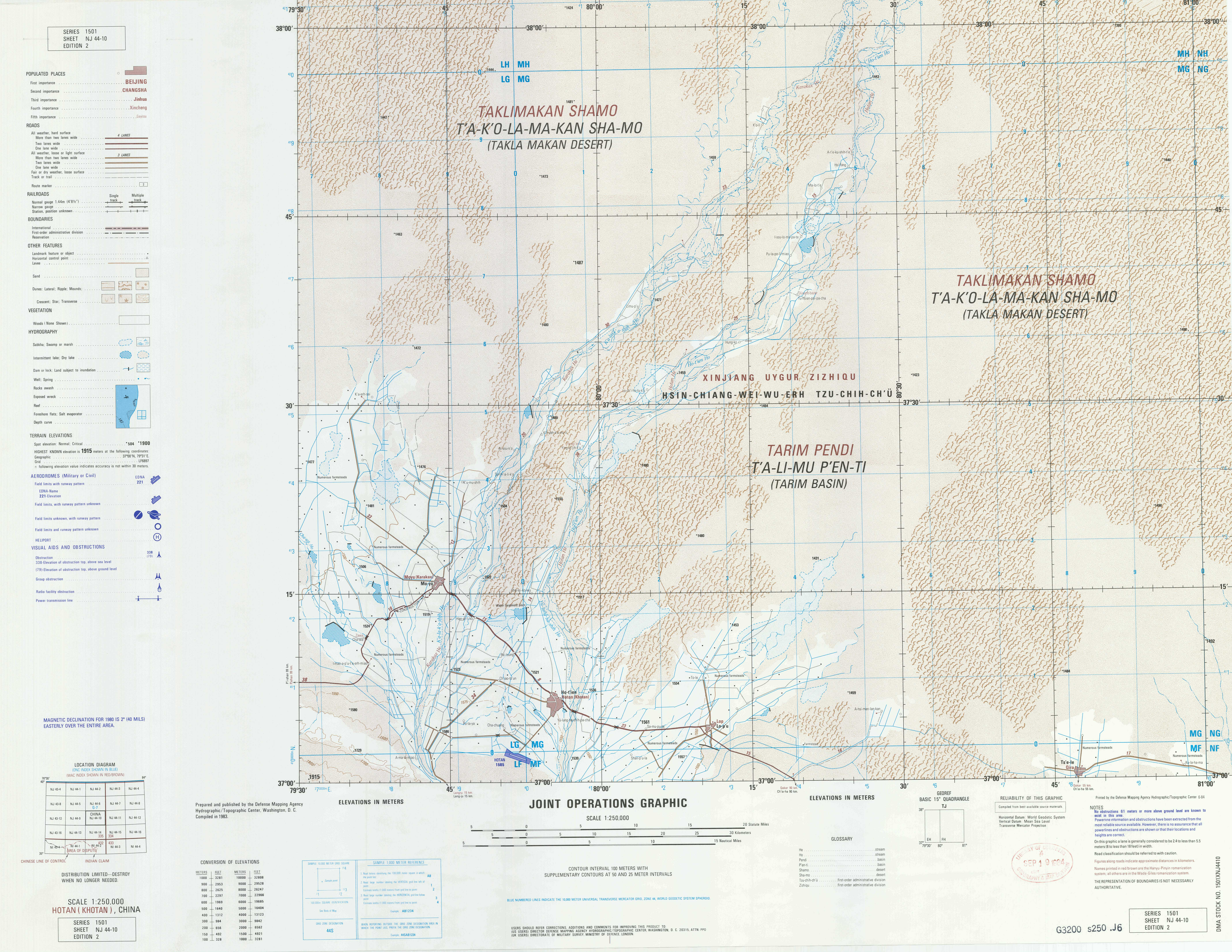
Map of the region including Lop (Lo-p'u) (DMA, 1983)

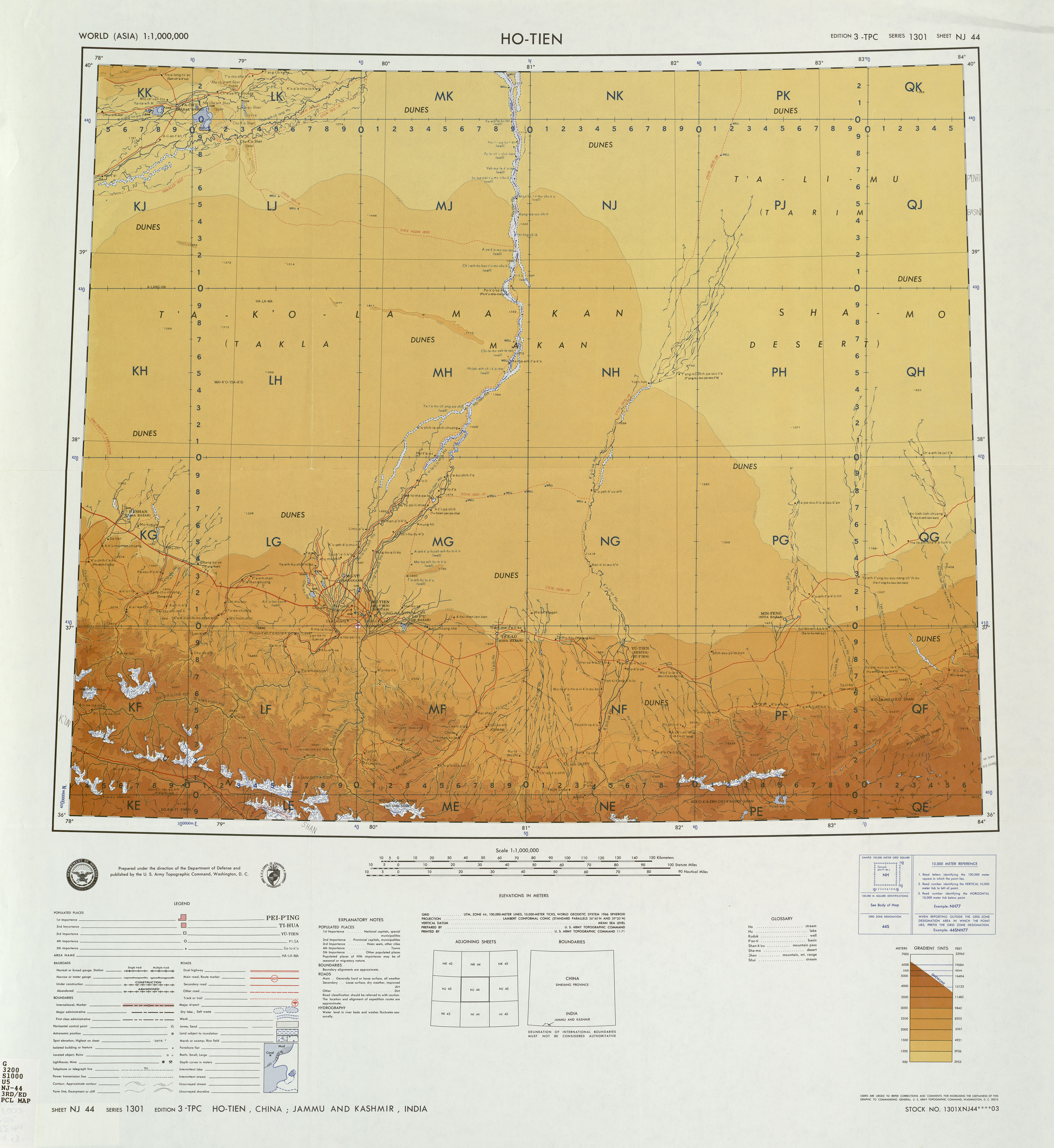
Map including Lop (labeled as LO-P'U (LOP BAZAR)) and surrounding region (USATC, 1971) (Note: From map: "DELINEATION OF INTERNATIONAL BOUNDARIES MUST NOT BE CONSIDERED AUTHORITATIVE".)

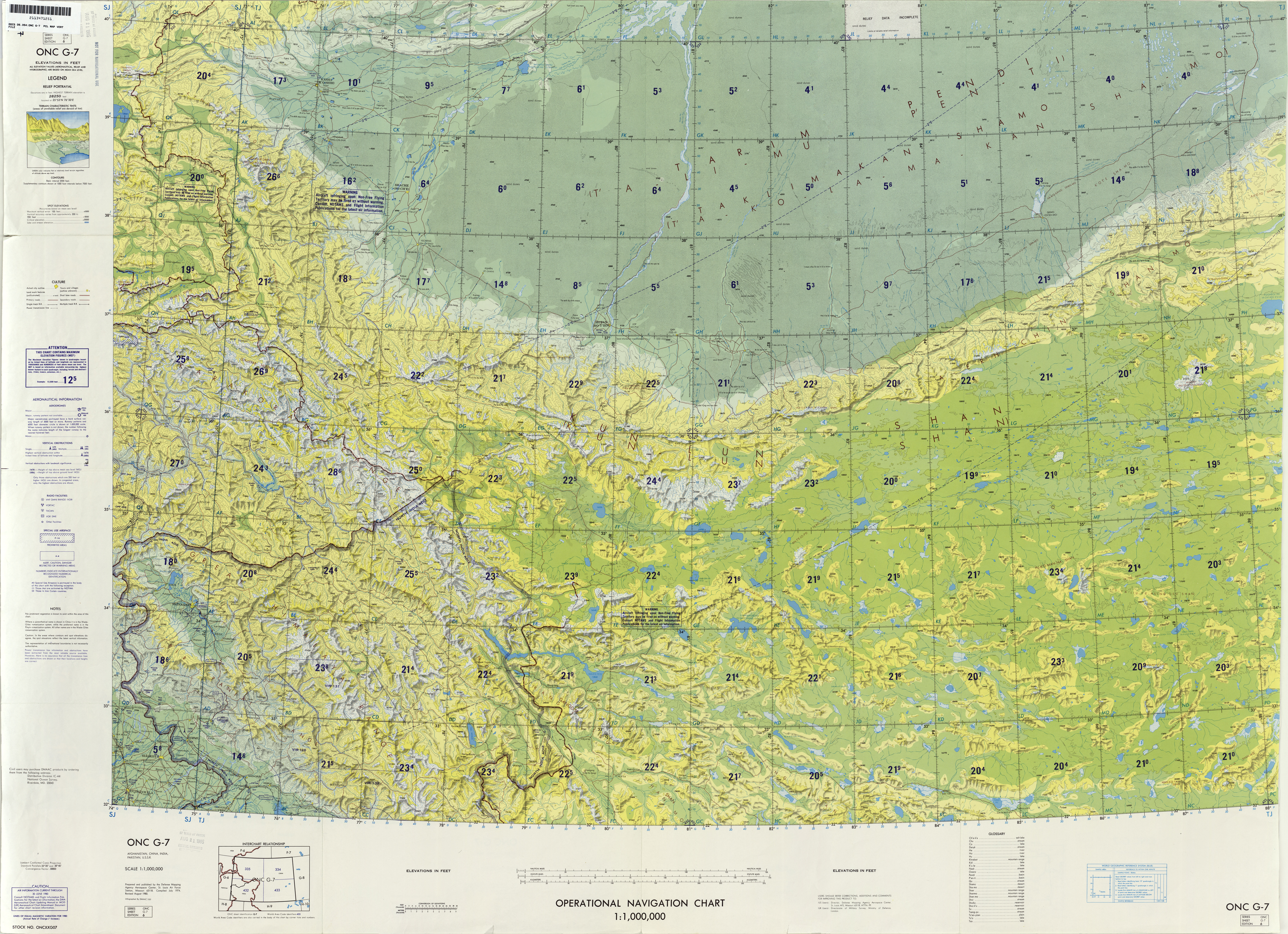
Map including Lop (labeled as LOP (LO-P'U)) and surrounding region (DMA, 1980) (Note: From map: "The representation of international boundaries is not necessarily authoritative.")

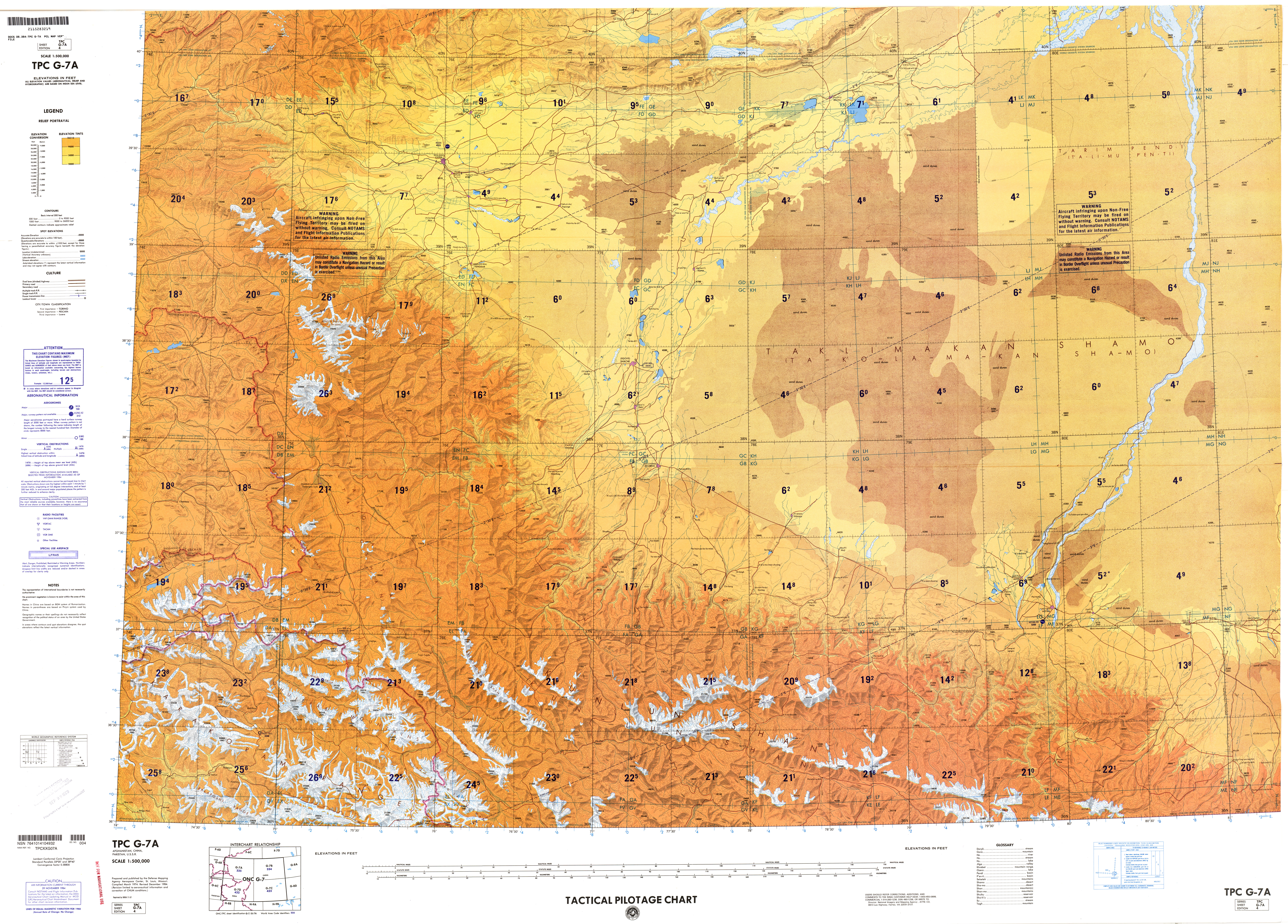
Map including Lop (labeled as Lop (Lo-p'u)) (DMA, 1984) (Note: From map: "The representation of international boundaries is not necessarily authoritative")

== Climate ==
Climate data for Lop, elevation 1,296 m (4,252 ft), (1991–2020 normals, extremes 1981–2010)
Month	Jan	Feb	Mar	Apr	May	Jun	Jul	Aug	Sep	Oct	Nov	Dec	Year
Record high °C (°F)	21.4 (70.5)	22.9 (73.2)	31.1 (88.0)	36.0 (96.8)	37.2 (99.0)	40.5 (104.9)	40.5 (104.9)	39.3 (102.7)	35.8 (96.4)	31.0 (87.8)	25.0 (77.0)	18.6 (65.5)	40.5 (104.9)
Mean daily maximum °C (°F)	1.7 (35.1)	7.8 (46.0)	17.2 (63.0)	24.6 (76.3)	28.4 (83.1)	31.4 (88.5)	32.8 (91.0)	31.5 (88.7)	27.8 (82.0)	21.6 (70.9)	12.7 (54.9)	3.8 (38.8)	20.1 (68.2)
Daily mean °C (°F)	−4.7 (23.5)	1.1 (34.0)	9.8 (49.6)	16.6 (61.9)	20.5 (68.9)	23.7 (74.7)	25.0 (77.0)	23.6 (74.5)	19.3 (66.7)	11.9 (53.4)	4.2 (39.6)	−2.6 (27.3)	12.4 (54.3)
Mean daily minimum °C (°F)	−10.1 (13.8)	−4.9 (23.2)	2.8 (37.0)	9.1 (48.4)	13.2 (55.8)	16.8 (62.2)	18.5 (65.3)	17.1 (62.8)	12.0 (53.6)	3.9 (39.0)	−2.5 (27.5)	−7.6 (18.3)	5.7 (42.2)
Record low °C (°F)	−23.9 (−11.0)	−23.3 (−9.9)	−8.4 (16.9)	−0.2 (31.6)	2.8 (37.0)	7.9 (46.2)	10.2 (50.4)	7.2 (45.0)	2.6 (36.7)	−4.7 (23.5)	−11.5 (11.3)	−20.1 (−4.2)	−23.9 (−11.0)
Average precipitation mm (inches)	1.6 (0.06)	2.1 (0.08)	3.3 (0.13)	3.5 (0.14)	7.1 (0.28)	8.9 (0.35)	8.1 (0.32)	6.1 (0.24)	4.3 (0.17)	0.8 (0.03)	0.9 (0.04)	1.0 (0.04)	47.7 (1.88)
Average precipitation days (≥ 0.1 mm)	2.2	1.3	0.8	1.4	2.1	3.7	3.0	2.5	1.3	0.3	0.4	1.5	20.5
Average snowy days	5.2	2.7	0.6	0	0	0	0	0	0	0	0.6	3.6	12.7
Average relative humidity (%)	58	48	35	35	42	46	52	57	57	54	52	59	50
Mean monthly sunshine hours	168.0	170.0	188.5	206.8	244.5	249.2	235.8	219.8	232.8	263.0	216.5	180.8	2,575.7
Percentage possible sunshine	54	55	50	52	55	57	53	53	64	77	72	61	59
Source: China Meteorological Administration

== Administrative divisions ==
The county includes 1 subdistrict, 4 towns, 5 townships, and 1 other area:

Name	Simplified Chinese	Hanyu Pinyin	Uyghur (UEY)	Uyghur Latin (ULY)	Administrative division code	Notes
Subdistrict
Chengqu Subdistrict	城区街道	Chéngqū Jiēdào	شەھەر رايونى كوچا باشقارمىسى	sheher rayoni kocha bashqarmisi	653224001	
Towns
Lop Town	洛浦镇	Luòpǔ Zhèn	لوپ بازىرى	lop baziri	653224100	
Sampul Town	山普鲁镇	Shānpǔlǔ Zhèn	سامپۇل بازىرى	sampul baziri	653224101	formerly Sampul Township (山普鲁乡)
Hanggiya Town	杭桂镇	Hángguì Zhèn	ھاڭگىيا بازىرى	hanggiya baziri	653224102	formerly Hanggiya Township (杭桂乡)
Charbagh Town	恰尔巴格镇	Qià'ěrbāgé Zhèn	چارباغ بازىرى	charbagh baziri	653224103	formerly Charbagh Township (چارباغ يېزىسى / 恰尔巴格乡)
Townships
Buya Township	布亚乡	Bùyǎ Xiāng	بۇيا يېزىسى	buya yëzisi	653224201	
Dol Township	多鲁乡	Duōlǔ Xiāng	دول يېزىسى	dol yëzisi	653224205	
Nawa Township	纳瓦乡	Nàwǎ Xiāng	ناۋا يېزىسى	nawa yëzisi	653224206	
Beshtoghraq Township	拜什托格拉克乡	Bàishítuōgélākè Xiāng	بەشتوغراق يېزىسى	beshtoghraq yëzisi	653224207	
Aqqik Township	阿其克乡	Āqíkè Xiāng	ئاچچىق يېزىسى	Achchiq yëzisi	653224208	

Other:

- Lop County Beijing Industrial Park (洛浦县北京工业园区)

== Economy ==
The county is known for its silk and carpets. The county's economy is primarily agricultural, producing cotton, wheat, corn and silkworm cocoons. Industries in the county include tractor repair, concrete, carpets, and silk reeling.

As of 1885, there was about 44,300 acres (293,944 mu) of cultivated land in Lop.

== Demographics ==
Historical population
Year	Pop.	±% p.a.
2000	235,716	—
2010	232,916	−0.12%

According to the 2002 census, it had a population of 240,000.

At the end of 2008, 98% of the population of Lop County was Uyghur and 1.9% of the population was Han Chinese.

As of 2015, 282,513 of the 287,590 residents of the county were Uyghur, 4,895 were Han Chinese and 182 were from other ethnic groups.

As of the 2010s, the population of the county, reported as 280,000 by The Guardian, was almost entirely Uyghur.

As of 1999, 98.6% of the population of Lop (Luopu) County was Uyghur and 1.36% of the population was Han Chinese.

In 1952, the population of Lop was 123,608.

== Transportation ==
- China National Highway 217 through the Taklamakan Desert to northern Xinjiang
- China National Highway 315 between Hotan and Qira County
- G3012 Turpan–Hotan Expressway
