= Rawak Stupa =

Buddhist stupa in Xinjiang, China

Rawak
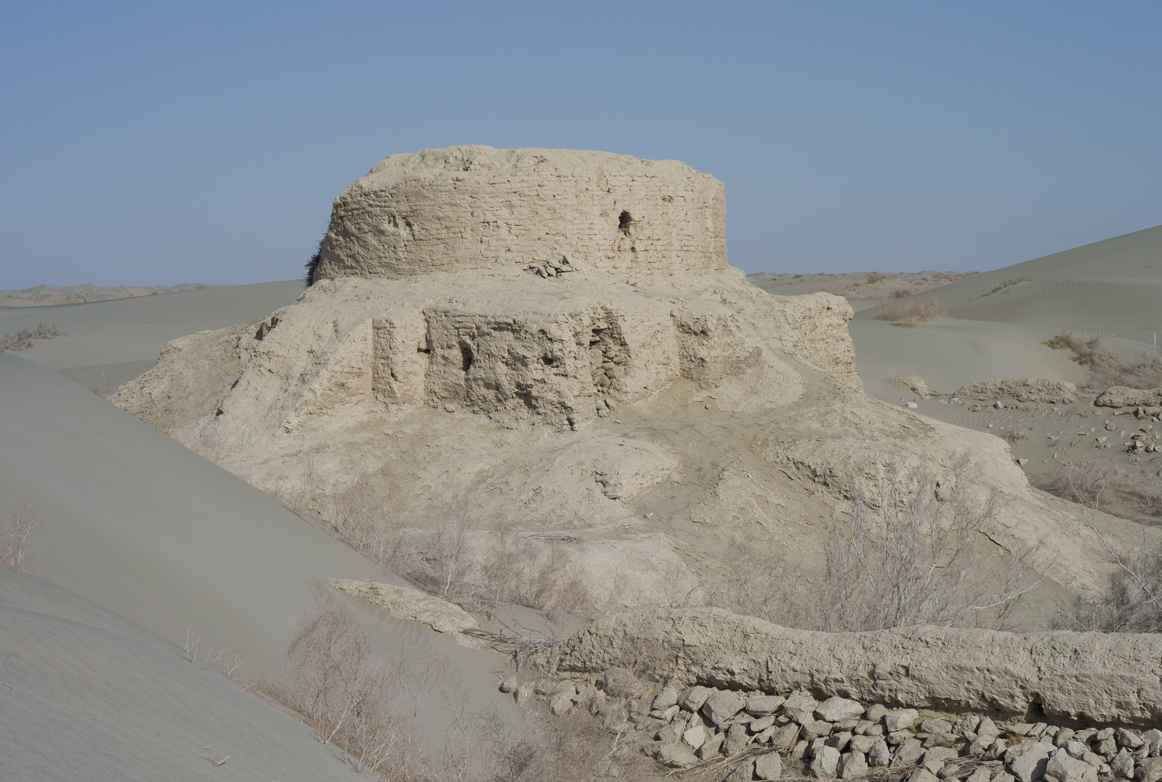
- Rawak Stupa from above southwest wall. November 2008.

- Location of Rawak Stupa
- 37.3460°N 80.1635°E
- Location: China
- Region: Lop County, Hotan Prefecture, Xinjiang

Rawak (Chinese: 热瓦克佛寺遗址) is a Buddhist stupa located on the southern rim of the Taklamakan Desert in Xinjiang, China, along the famous trade route known as the Silk Road in the first millennium Kingdom of Khotan. Around the stupa there are other smaller structures which were originally decorated with a large number of colossal statues. The courtyard of the temple was surrounded by a wall, which contained terracotta relieves and some wall-paintings. The stupa and other structures form a three-dimensional mandala. The site is now about 40 km north of the modern city of Hotan (Chinese: 和田) in Xinjiang Autonomous Region, China.

== Excavations of the site ==
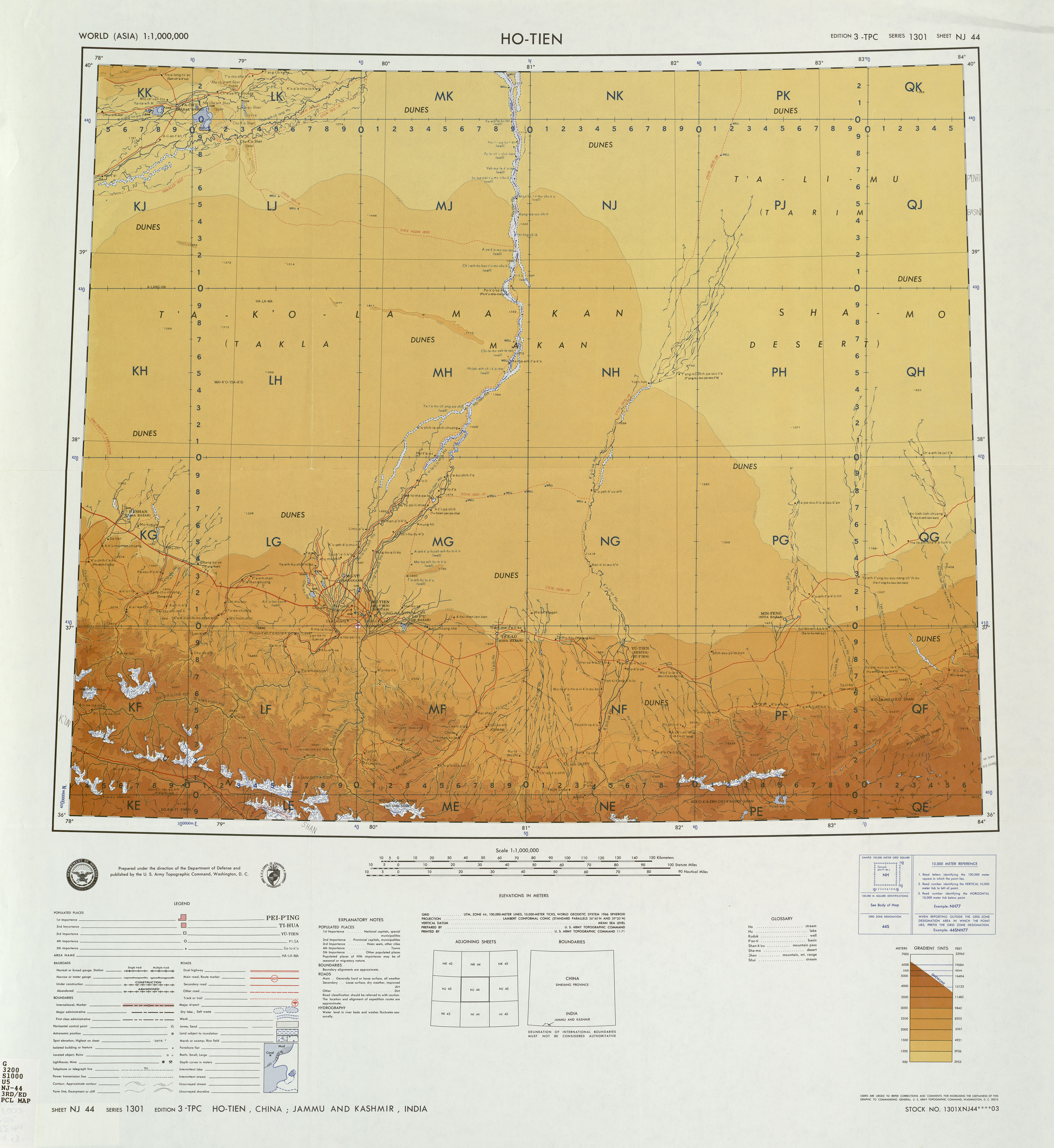
Map including the path of the expeditions of Aurel Stein through the Taklamakan Desert past Rawak Stupa in the early 20th century (USATC, 1971)

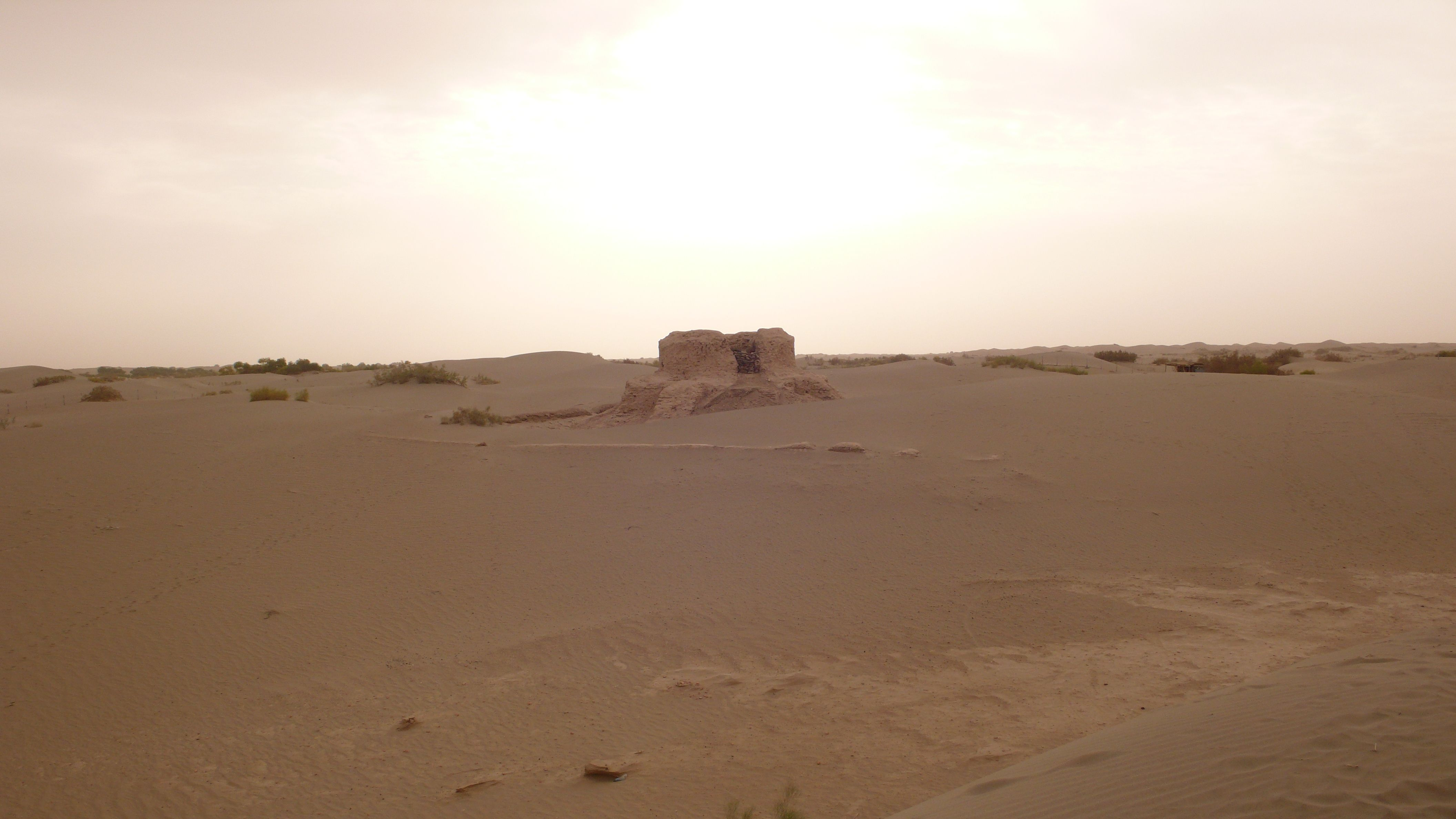

- 1901: The archaeologist Aurel Stein first visited Rawak during his First Central Asian expedition in April 1901. At the site he found the large stupa which he described as 'by far the most imposing structure I had seen among the extant ruins of the Khotan region.' Part of the stupa, and almost all of the rest of the site, was covered by sand dunes, in places rising to about 25 ft. In places where the sand left the walls and structures uncovered, he found fragments of coloured stucco from the statues lying in the sand.
  His excavations over the following eight days uncovered 91 large stucco statues of buddhas and bodhisattvas, with smaller ones in between of attendant gods. The sand that filled the ruins also played a conserving role, protecting the stuccos from the fierce wind and holding them up where they would have collapsed on their own. Therefore, when Stein left the site, he replaced the sand he had removed, writing, 'All that could be done in the case of these large sculptures was to bury them again safely in the sand after they had been photographed and described, and to trust that they would remain undisturbed under their protecting cover — until that time, still distant it seems, when Khotan shall have its own local museum.'
- 1906: Stein revisited on his second expedition in September 1906. As a result of the activities of treasure seekers most of the colossal statues had disappeared by Stein's second visit in 1906: 'the wall, which I had found lined with a continuous row of stucco relievo figures, mostly colossal, now displayed bare brickwork. My care in burying these under sand, just as I had found them, proved in vain, and of the interesting specimens of Khotan sculptural art then unearthed, all that survives now, I fear, are my photographs.'
  On this visit Stein excavated the ruins that lay between the great stupa and a nearby site complex known as Tati of Hanguya. Here he found many small terracotta reliefs dating, he thought, to the 5-6th centuries.
- 1928: The German-Swiss expedition (1928–29) under the leadership of Dr. Emil Trinkler also visited Rawak in 1928. The expedition gathered a significant amount of scientific (geological, climatic, etc.) material. Beside this, they also collected six cases of archaeological material which were later first seized by the local government but later allowed to be taken to Germany. In 1930, the Metropolitan Museum of Art acquired part of the Central Asian collection brought back by Trinkler, including some items from Rawak (e.g. a statue head with Hellenistic features. The rest of the material is now in Bremen, Germany.).
- 1929: The Chinese archaeologist Huang Wenbi, who was part of the Sino-Swedish expedition under the leadership of Sven Hedin, made a short visit to Rawak.

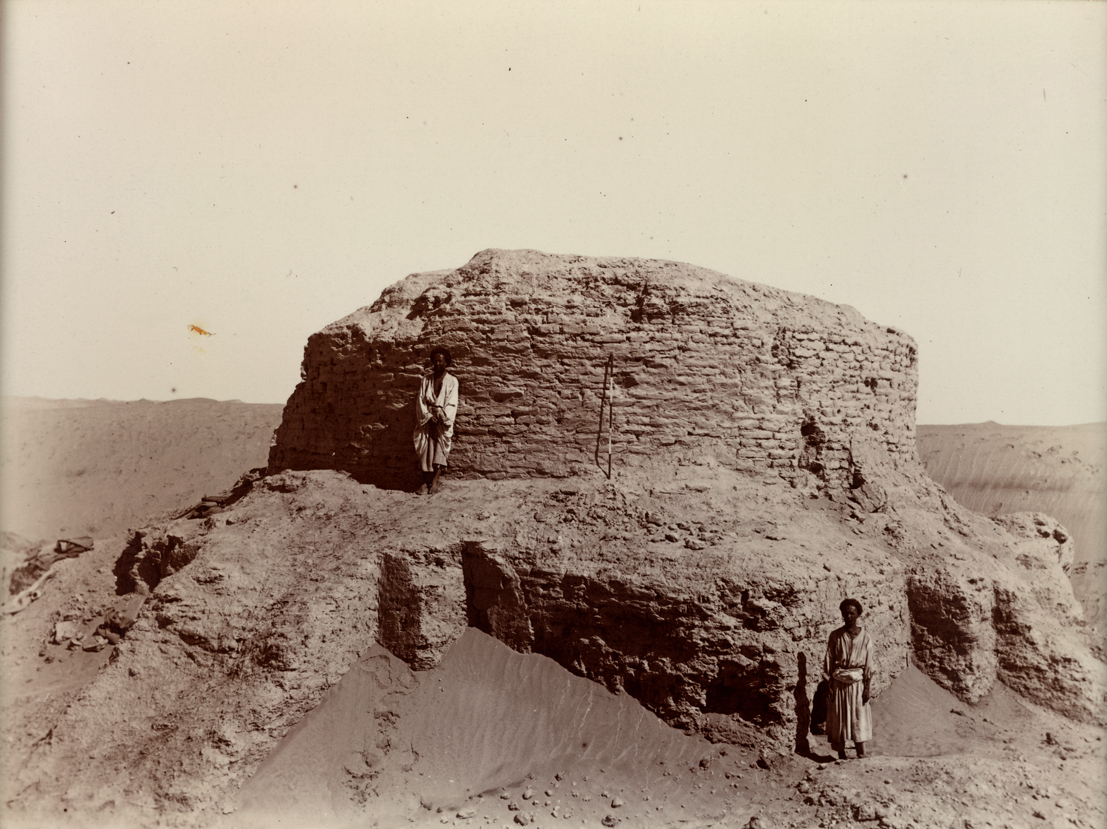
Rawak Stupa taken by Stein

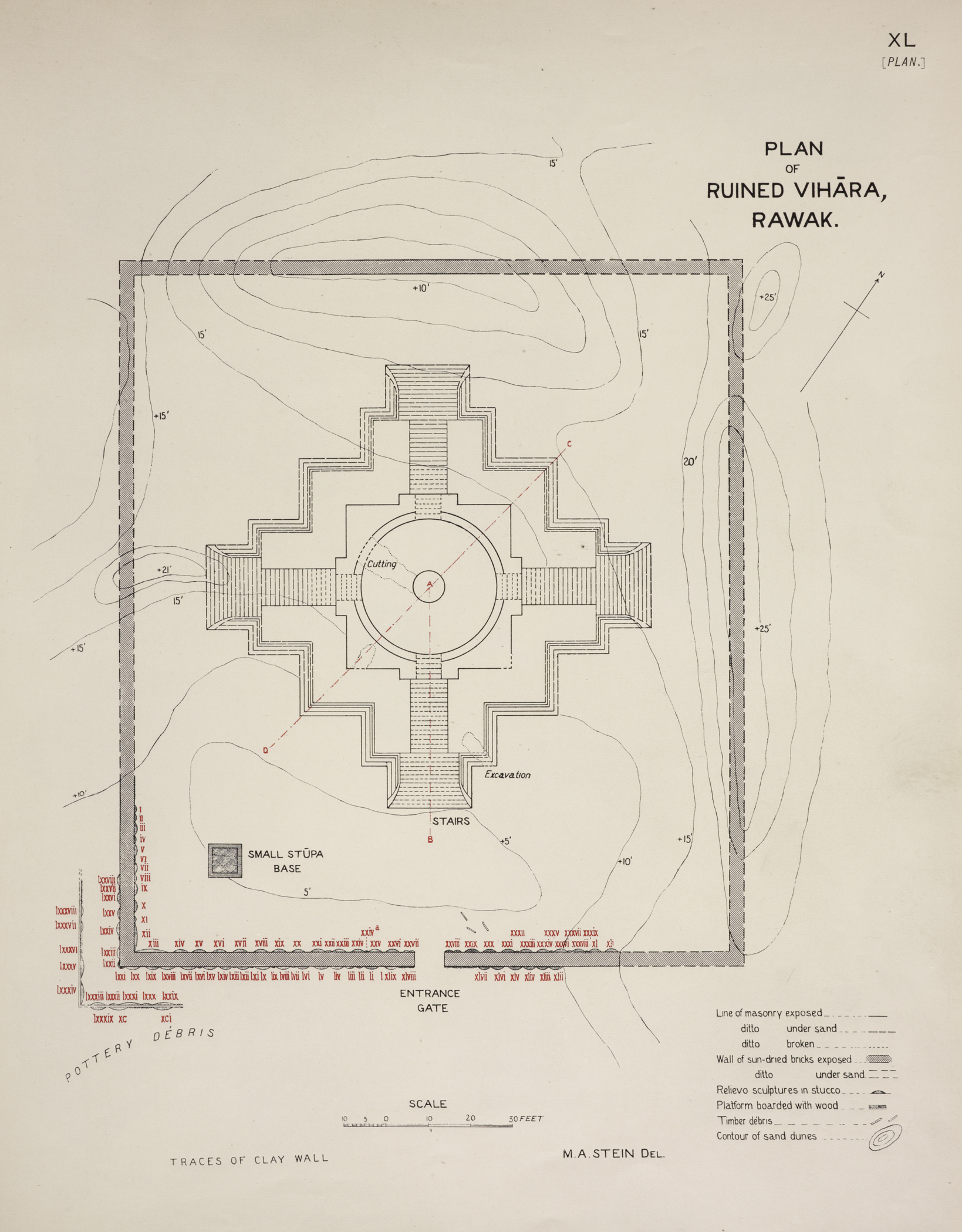
Stein's Plan of Rawak Stupa

== History and dating ==
The Rawak Stupa exemplifies a development from the stupa on a square base that emerges in and is seen elsewhere in the region, such as at Niya, to one on a cruciform-shaped base owing to the addition of staircases protruding out from the base on each side. This is seen in the Kanishka stupa dating to the Kushan and to Top-i-Rustam in Balkh. The form follows a scriptural description found in the Divyavadana, that describes a stupa as having four staircases, three platforms and an egg-like dome, as well as the other usual elements. Rawak is dated by several scholars to the fourth to fifth centuries, supported by finds, including coins, and stylistic considerations of the statues in the rectangular ambulatory, but also suggested by features such as the relic chamber placed high in the dome. This feature is common from the fourth and fifth centuries in stupas at Taxila and also seen in the Maura-Tim stupa at Kashgar. Stein suggested a possible late third to early fourth century date, based on the style of the stupa itself and the sculptures and paintings.
