= David C. King =

American political consultant

David C. King is an American political scientist who is Senior Lecturer in Public Policy at the Harvard Kennedy School, where he has taught since 1992. His research focuses on the United States Congress, political parties, and interest groups. He is Faculty Chair of Harvard's Bipartisan Program for Newly Elected Members of the U.S. Congress and of its Program for Senior Executives in State and Local Government.

== Education ==
King received an A.B. in government and philosophy from Lawrence University in 1985, and an A.M. (1990) and Ph.D. (1992) in political science from the University of Michigan.

== Career ==
King joined the Harvard Kennedy School faculty in 1992 as an assistant professor, and served as associate professor from 1999 to 2003, lecturer in public policy from 2003 to 2012, and senior lecturer since 2012. His courses have focused on legislatures, political parties, and interest groups.

From 1994 to 2003, he ran Harvard's executive program for members of the Russian State Duma and Federation Council. He has advised on legislative design issues in several countries, including South Korea, Nicaragua, Chile, and Bolivia.

He is a Senior Lecturer in Public Policy at The Harvard Kennedy School and the Faculty Chair of Harvard's Program for Newly Elected Members of the U.S. Congress and Harvard's executive program for leaders in State and Local Governments. King is the faculty director of Harvard's program for Newly Elected Members of the U.S. Congress which introduces officials to the complex legal and ethical issues involved in holding office. Along with John Della Volpe, founder of SocialSphere and Director of Polling at Harvard Kennedy School's Institute of Politics, King has overseen Harvard's Youth Poll.

=== Election reform work ===
Following the 2000 United States presidential election, King directed the Task Force on Election Administration for the National Commission on Federal Election Reform, chaired by former presidents Gerald Ford and Jimmy Carter. The commission's recommendations were largely adopted in the Help America Vote Act of 2002. In 2006–2007, King served as overseer of the Boston Election Department following administrative problems in the city's 2006 election, appointed by Mayor Thomas Menino.

=== Publications ===
King is co-author with Zachary Karabell of The Generation of Trust: How the U.S. Military has Regained the Public's Confidence since Vietnam, (The American Enterprise Institute, 2003) He is the author of Turf Wars: How Congressional Committees Claim Jurisdiction, (University of Chicago Press, 1997), and co-editor with Joseph S. Nye and Philip Zelikow on Why People Don't Trust Government, (Harvard University Press, 1997). Also published in Japanese (Tokyo: Eiji Shuppan, 2002).

=== Awards ===
King's book Turf Wars: How Congressional Committees Claim Jurisdiction received the American Political Science Association's Richard F. Fenno Jr. Prize for the best book in legislative studies in 1998.

His doctoral dissertation received APSA's E. E. Schattschneider Prize for best dissertation in American government in 1993.
