= Huafu Fashion =

Chinese textile company

- Company type: Public
- Industry: cotton production, processing, and acquisition
- Founded: 2000
- Headquarters: Huaibei, Anhui
- Website: www.e-huafu.com

Huafu Fashion (Chinese: 华孚时尚, SZSE: 002042) was created in 2000, formerly known as Huafu Color Textile, and on October 12, 2017, it changed its name to the current one. The company is registered in Anhui Province and is the first color textile company listed on Shanghai Stock Exchange.

== History ==
In 2013, the company invested in a new industrial park and improved its manufacturing line in the new location of Huaibei Economic Development Zone. Since its foundation, the corporation has formed subsidiaries in numerous areas, including Shaoxing and Aksu.

=== U.S. sanctions ===
On December 4, 2024, Huafu Fashion created a new wholly owned company in Xinjiang, which focuses on cotton production, processing, and acquisition, among other projects. In January 2025, Huafu Fashion and 25 of its subsidiaries were banned from importing to the United States under the Uyghur Forced Labor Prevention Act.
