= Dickson Poon =

Hong Kong business magnate (born 1956)

Sir Dickson Poon CBE SBS
- 潘廸生
- Born: 19 June 1956 (age 70); British Hong Kong
- Occupations: Founder & Chairman of Dickson Concepts
- Spouses: Marjorie Yang (div.) Michelle Yeoh (m. 1988; div. 1992) Pearl Yu (m. 1992)
- Children: 5

Dickson Poon
- Chinese: 潘廸生
Transcriptions
Standard Mandarin
- Hanyu Pinyin: Pān Díshēng
Yue: Cantonese
- Yale Romanization: Pūn Dihksāang
- Jyutping: Pun1 Dik6-saang1

Sir Dickson Poon CBE SBS (Chinese: 潘廸生; born 19 June 1956) is a Hong Kong business magnate in the luxury goods retailing sector. Poon is the executive chairman of his Hong Kong–based and listed company Dickson Concepts (DCIL), which owns companies including Harvey Nichols and S. T. Dupont. In 1987, Dupont was sold to Dickson Concepts, as part of a restructuring plan announced by Gillette.

Through trusts, he controls 40.13% of the voting capital of DCIL as of 31 March 2008.

== Education ==
Poon was educated at St Joseph's College, Hong Kong.

== Film ==
Along with Sammo Hung, Poon founded D&B Films Co., Ltd which released action and martial arts motion pictures such as the In the Line of Duty series, Hong Kong 1941, Legacy of Rage and more than 50 other titles. The company's last production, Black Cat II: Assassination of President Yeltsin ("Hei mao zhi ci sha Ye Li Qin"), was in 1992.

== Personal life ==
Poon's first marriage was to Marjorie Yang, daughter of Hong Kong textile magnate Y. L. Yang (Yang Yuan-Loong), and chairwoman of the Esquel Group. They have a daughter, Dee Poon Chu-ying (Chinese: 潘楚穎).

In 1984, Poon's company signed the then-21-year-old Miss Malaysia, Michelle Yeoh, to appear in a television ad opposite Jackie Chan. That appearance, with Poon's help, subsequently helped to launch Yeoh's motion picture career with the 1985 martial arts film Yes, Madam. Four years later, in February 1988, Yeoh suspended her movie career to marry Poon. She resumed it three-and-a-half years later when the couple separated in 1991.

He married his third wife Kwai-chu "Pearl" Yu in 1992. They have four children, daughters Daryl and Dana and sons Pearson (Chinese: 潘冠達) and Dexter. Pearson, a Cambridge graduate, was appointed as an Executive Director of Dickson Concepts on 14 December 2018.

== Academic gifts ==
In November 2010, Poon donated £10 million to St Hugh's College, Oxford for the construction of the Dickson Poon China Centre, which will bring together, for the first time, academics from a range of research interests related to China, provide accommodation for the college's postgraduate students, and house the Chinese Collection of the Bodleian Library.

Poon's donation to St. Hugh's College was followed two years later by a £20 million donation to King's College London to fund the existing law faculty. It was the largest donation by an individual to the University in its history. In recognition of his donation, the law school at King's College London was renamed The Dickson Poon School of Law.

== Honours ==
On 1 July 1999, Poon was awarded the Silver Bauhinia Star by the Chief Executive of Hong Kong, Tung Chee-hwa, "for his entrepreneurship and for his achievement in promoting Hong Kong's retail industry".

Poon was knighted in the 2015 New Year Honours for services to business and charity, especially higher education.

== Insider dealing ==
On 31 July 2026, the Market Misconduct Tribunal of Hong Kong (chaired by Michael Lunn) found Poon culpable of insider dealing in the shares of Dickson Concepts while in possession of price‑sensitive information concerning a transaction that would ultimately generate HK$1.15 billion in cash for the company.
