= Robert Mazlo =

- Born: 1949 (age 76–77); Beirut, Lebanon
- Occupations: Art jeweller and goldsmith

Robert Mazlo (born 1949) is a French art jeweller and goldsmith of Lebanese origin who has been the head of the Paris-based Mazlo jewellery house since the late 1970s.

== Early life ==
Robert Mazlo was born in Beirut, Lebanon, in 1949 in a family of goldsmiths and jewellers. After having received a first initiation within the family workshop, he left Lebanon in 1968 to study classical European jewellery in Italy at the Istituto d’Arte Benvenuto Cellini, Valenza.

== Career ==
In 1970 he was awarded the Gold Medal of the City of Florence for the design of a piece of jewellery.

After graduating, he returned to Lebanon in 1973 to found the Mazlo Workshop in Beirut. He worked there until the start of the Lebanese civil war in 1975, when he moved permanently to Paris.

Parallel to the family tradition of bespoke jewellery, he soon developed his own creative work, exhibiting in art galleries and at the FIAC.

He also designed watches for ETA SA (Swatch and Rockwatch), and collaborated with ST Dupont for the design of barrels and clips set with diamonds.

Robert Mazlo's work appears in private and public collections worldwide including the Historisches Uhren-Museum in Wuppertal and the Deutsches Edelstein Museum of Idar-Oberstein, Germany.

== Book ==
Mazlo wrote a book on the tarot fortune-telling cards, The Tablets of Hermes. He said in an interview that mediaeval painters had to study jewellery before moving to painting; alchemy, considered a science at the time and interpreted in the tarot, required knowledge of stones and jewels. Mazlo said that tarot and the golden ratio helped him a lot in designing his jewels.
