= Helina Chan =

Singaporean gallerist

Helina Chan is a Singaporean gallerist. She is the founder and managing director of the iPreciation art gallery.

== Early life and education ==
Chan was born to an Indonesian-Chinese couple in Shanghai. After hearing rumours that her older sister would be sent to the countryside as part of the youth re-education programme, the family moved to Hong Kong, where Chan was raised. Although she initially wished to become an artist, her father was not supportive of her ambitions, believing that she would "end up a beggar". However, he allowed her to study at the Hong Kong Polytechnic for a diploma in textiles and weaving as the fashion industry in Hong Kong then was "booming".

== Career ==
After graduating from the polytechnic, Chan became a marketing agent with Polo Ralph Lauren. She then began working at Esquel Group, a textiles manufacturer. After having "burnt out", she decided to quit working with the company. She then began working with Artpreciation, an art gallery opened by a friend of hers in 1994. However, due to the upcoming Handover of Hong Kong, she left the gallery and came to Singapore, where she had previously frequently travelled for work, in 1995. In 1998, she came across Hong Kong artist Cheung Yee, an acquaintance of hers. She organised an exhibition of his works at the Alliance Française de Singapour the following year. The experience "opened her eyes" and she opened the iPreciation art gallery in a shophouse along Kim Yam Road later that year.

The gallery initially featured works by artists from Hong Kong and China, including artist and singer Koo Mei. In 2002, she organised a sculpture show, which was held at the water promenade at One Fullerton. In 2004, she organised an exhibition at the Singapore Art Museum featuring works by Taiwanese sculptor Ju Ming after she had received his approval. His works were also displayed along Orchard Road and at the Changi Airport. The exhibition was an "international hit" and it enabled her to work with younger and "riskier" artists, including Hilmi Johandi and Filip Gudovic. She was also involved in the organising of an exhibition at the Singapore Art Museum featuring artworks by novelist Gao Xingjian, which was held in October 2005. She had been awarded the Singapore Tourism Board's NewTourism Entrepreneur of the Year Award earlier that year for her "work as a patron for local artists here and for bringing art into the museum." The exhibition was the "first retrospective exhibition of Gao in Asia."

In 2009, she opened a branch of iPreciation in Hong Kong. From 2010 to 2012, she continued to work with galleries and organise exhibitions, including the first solo-exhibition of local artist Milenko Prvacki, which was held in Hong Kong in 2010. She was also involved in an exhibition featuring works by French sculptor Bernar Venet, which was held in the Marina Bay area in 2012. During this period, she also moved the iPreciation gallery from the Fullerton Hotel to Cuscaden Road. The opening exhibition of the gallery's new premises featured works by Prvacki, Goh Beng Kwan, Lee Wen, Qwek Wee Chew, Tay Bak Chiang, Suzann Victor and Michael Lee. However, following the end of the Hong Kong branch's lease in 2013, she decided to close the branch. By April 2015, she had exhibited works by local artists such as Prvacki, Tay, Lee Wen, Tang Da Wu, Boo Sze Yang, and Chen Sai Hua Kuan, as well as Ju Ming and Hong Kong artist Tse Yim On, at the Art Paris Art Fair.

== Personal life ==
Chan is divorced. After leaving Shanghai with her family, she became stateless and used a Hong Kong Certificate of Identity. On moving to Singapore, she became a Singaporean citizen. Soon after organising the Gao Xingjian exhibition in 2005, she fell ill. She underwent treatment for hypothyroidism in the following year and was diagnosed with an auto-immune disease which was then "under control". However, her condition worsened in 2010 and she was diagnosed with lupus, leaky kidneys and a low white blood cell count. Her health improved after two years. On 5 November 2014, she launched the Reverie Rheumatology Research Fund with a charity dinner. She received the support of several artists, including Lee Wen, Michael Lee, Johandi, Prvacki, Boo, Tay, Jeremy Sharma, Wee Kheng Li, Donna Ong and Luke Heng, who all contributed artworks to the dinner for fundraising. The fund was the first "dedicated fund for rheumatology research" in Singapore.

In 2009, Chan's ex-boyfriend sued her for "oppressing his rights as a minority shareholder and of mismanaging iPreciation", of which he was also a director and shareholder. She was ordered by a judge to buy over his shares in the company. Adeline Chia of The Straits Times described the case as a "high-profile legal wrangle".
