= Tissot =

Swiss watch manufacturer

Tissot SA
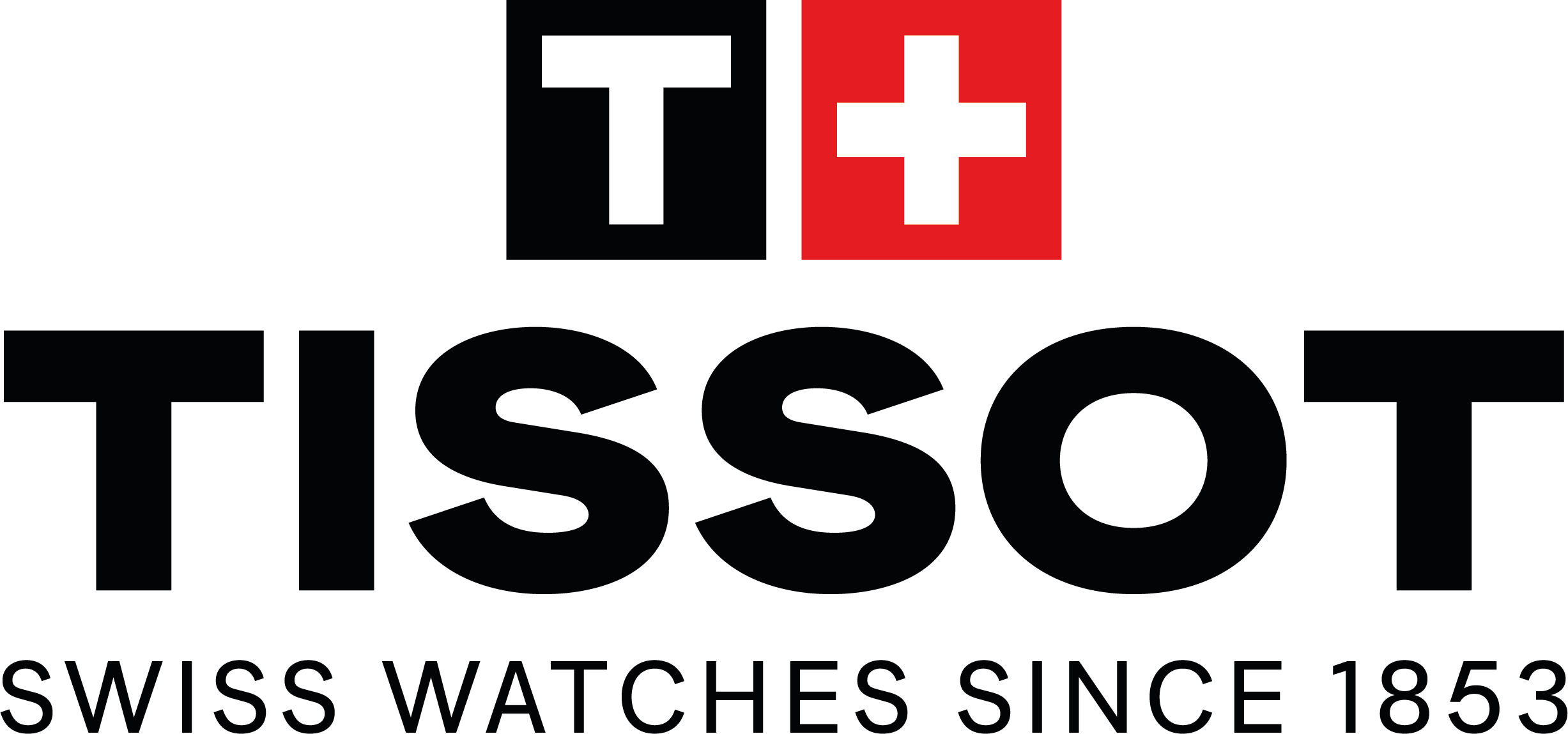

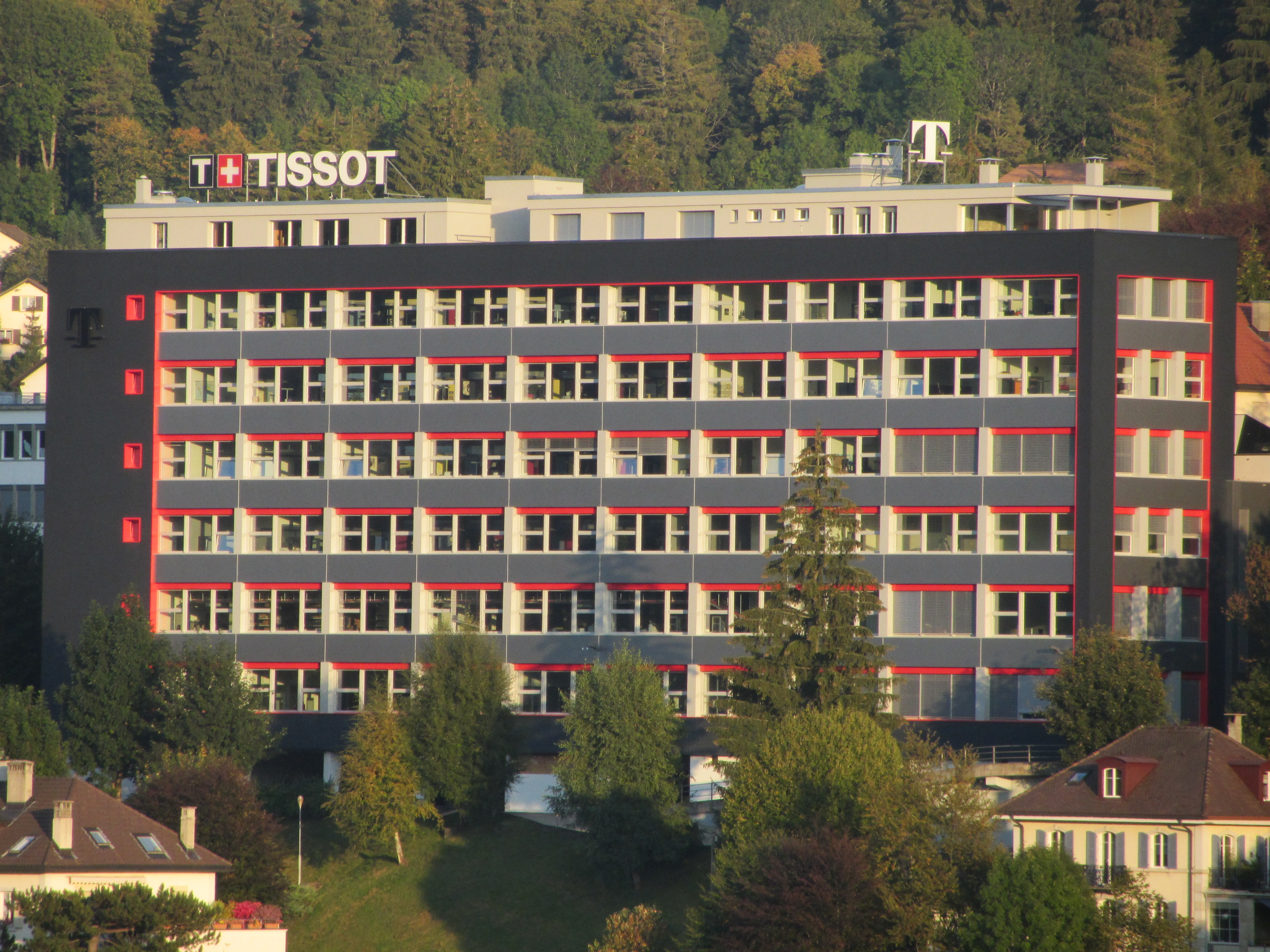
- Tissot's headquarters in Le Locle, Switzerland
- Type: Subsidiary
- Industry: Watchmaking
- Founded: 1853; 173 years ago in Le Locle
- Founders: Charles-Félicien Tissot; Charles-Emile Tissot
- Headquarters: Le Locle, Switzerland
- Area served: Worldwide
- Key people: Sylvain Dolla (CEO); Georges Nicolas Hayek Jr. (chairman of the board)
- Products: Watches, timing devices and systems
- Revenue: €1.0 billion (2017)
- Number of employees: 250
- Parent: The Swatch Group
- Website: tissotwatches.com

Tissot SA (English: /tiːˈsoʊ/, French: [ti'so]) is a Swiss luxury watchmaker owned by the Swatch Group. The company was founded in Le Locle, Switzerland, by Charles-Félicien Tissot and his son, Charles-Émile Tissot, in 1853.

Tissot is not associated with Mathey-Tissot, another Swiss watchmaking firm.

== History ==
=== Independent company ===
Tissot was founded in 1853 by Charles-Félicien Tissot and his son Charles-Émile Tissot in the Swiss city of Le Locle, in the Neuchâtel canton of the Jura Mountains area. The father and son team worked as a casemaker (Charles-Félicien Tissot) and watchmaker (Charles-Emile), with the son having expressed an interest in watchmaking from a young age. The two turned their house at the time into a small 'factory'. Charles-Emile Tissot left for Russia in 1858 and succeeded in selling their savonnette pocket watches across the Russian Empire. Russia became Tissot's greatest market, with the brand gaining popularity even in the Tsar's court; so Charles Tissot, Charles-Émile's son, moved to Moscow in 1885 to manage the branch his father had set up there.

By the late nineteenth century, the Russian Empire had become one of the most important export markets for Swiss watch manufacturers, with firms such as Tissot benefiting from growing demand among both urban consumers and the imperial elite.

=== Omega, SSIH, ASUAG, SMH ===
In 1929, the global financial collapse brought the entire watch industry to a standstill, and Omega and Tissot forged an alliance under the leadership of Paul Tissot-Daguette, who had been trained at Tissot and became Omega's chief executive officer in 1930. The merger formed Société Suisse pour l'Industrie Horlogère (SSIH), and Tissot-Omega watches from this era are sought after by collectors.

Tissot's first engagement as an official timekeeper was in 1938 where they timed a series of ski races in Villars-sur-Ollon, near the company's home town in swiss Alps. Tissot was used for timing downhill skiing in Switzerland in 1938, and for the Davis Cup in 1957.

SSIH-ASUAG was formed in 1983 (Allgemeine Schweizerische Uhrenindustrie Aktiengesellschaft, ASUAG, was a holding company supplying the watch industry), then SMH (Société Suisse de Microélectronique et d’horlogerie; 1983–1985).

=== Swatch subsidiary ===
SMH took the name of the Swatch Group in 1998. Tissot SA remained in Le Locle, Switzerland, and marketed in 160 countries. Tissot watches are classified by the Swatch Group as "mid-range market" products.

Tissot is an official timekeeper for the world championships in cycling, motorcycling, fencing and ice hockey, etc. Tissot was a sponsor for the Formula One car-racing teams Lotus, Renault, and Sauber. In the past handheld stopwatches were sufficient to provide official timings; in more recent times manufacturers and sporting bodies together develop more accurate systems for specific events. In competitive cycling, for instance, sensors are placed on the bikes and track, and linked by computers to provide track timings and performance data.

=== PRX ===
Swatch distinguished itself on the global watch market in 2021 with the re-release of the PRX, a stainless steel watch with integrated bracelet. The first PRX was released in 1978 and enjoyed a brief but successful run before it was discontinued in the 1980s. Positive word-of-mouth, the variety of face colors offered, and the watch's perceived general affordability and versatility (combined with its durability) served to make the watch one of the most successful timepieces of the 2020s. Shortly after its release, the watch rivaled Rolex in popularity, with Tissot stores struggling to keep the watch in stock.

In November 2025, Tissot announced the 38mm PRX in Damascus Steel and Titanium versions. The 38mm models were welcomed by fans, as the 38mm size become popular amongst collectors.

== Motto and slogan ==
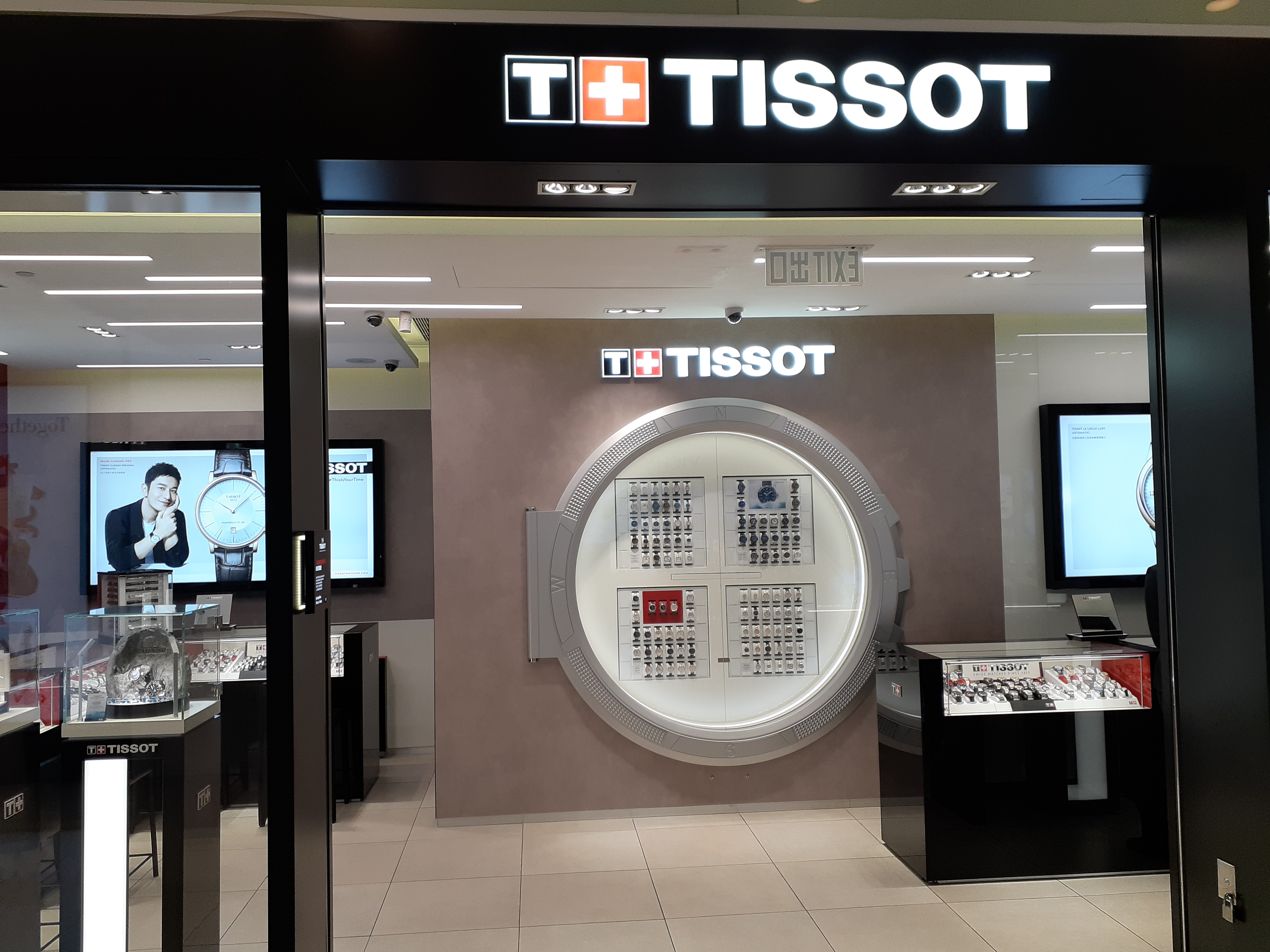
Tissot store in Hong Kong

The company motto/slogan of Tissot is "Innovators by Tradition" and its mission statement is "gold value at silver price".

== Innovations ==
Tissot introduced the first mass-produced pocket watch as well as the first pocket watch with two time zones in 1853 and the first anti-magnetic watch, in 1929–30. Tissot was also one of the first companies to manufacture an antimagnetic wristwatch in the early 1930s. The Tissot company was also the first to make watches out of plastic (Idea 2001 in 1971), stone (the Alpine granite RockWatch in 1985), mother of pearl (the Pearl watch in 1987), and wood (the Wood watch in 1988).

Tissot introduced its first tactile watch, with "T-Touch," technology in 1999; watches containing this technology have touch-sensitive sapphire crystals to control various functions including compass, barometer, altimeter and thermometer. The 2014 T-Touch Expert Solar and T-Touch Lady Solar had 25 functions.

== Gallery ==
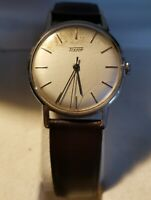
Tissot watch from 1958, manual winding, 33 millimeters, in-house movement with Manual winding

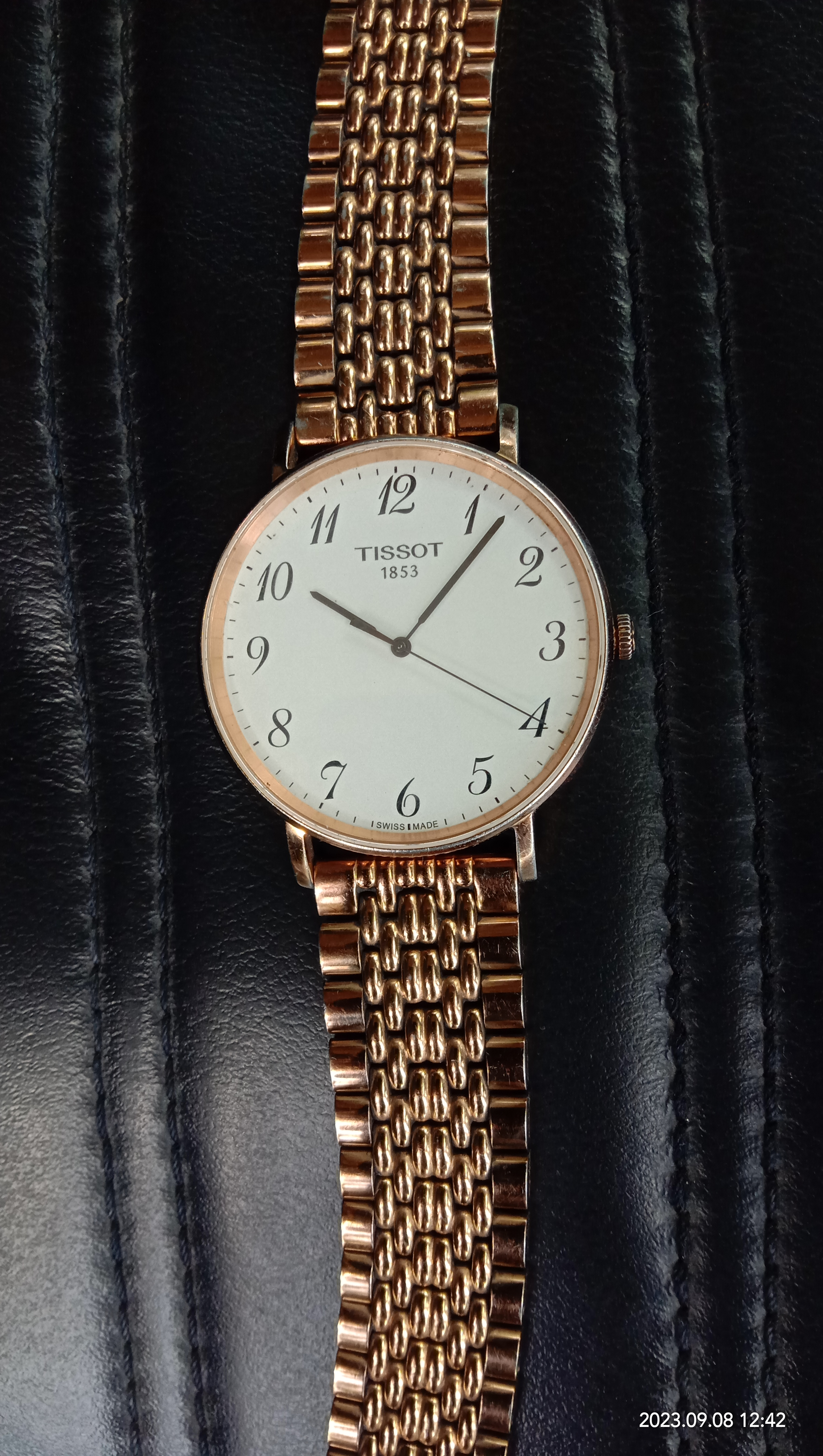
Tissot 1853 hand watch in Chennai Tamil Nadu

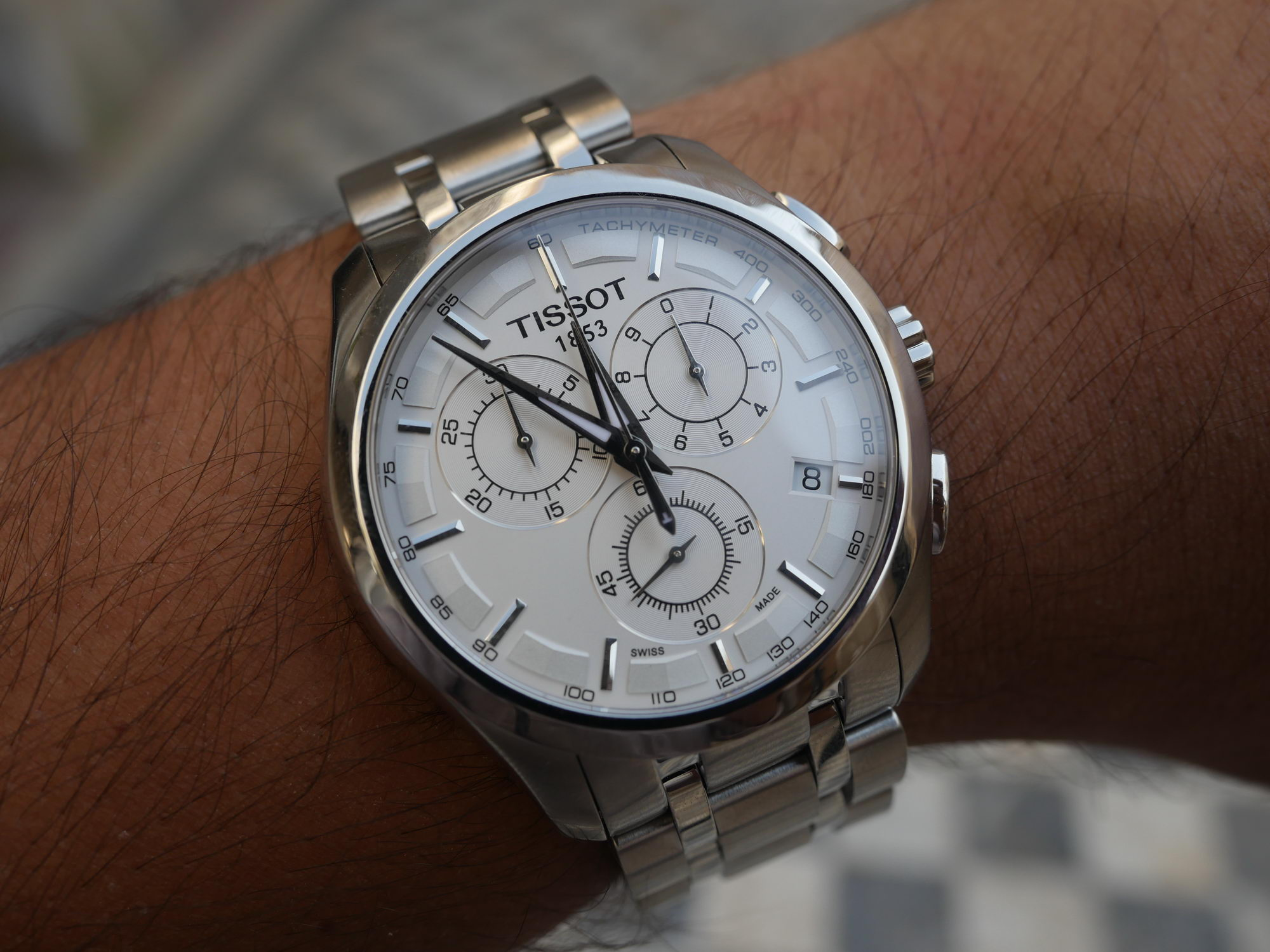
Tissot Couturier

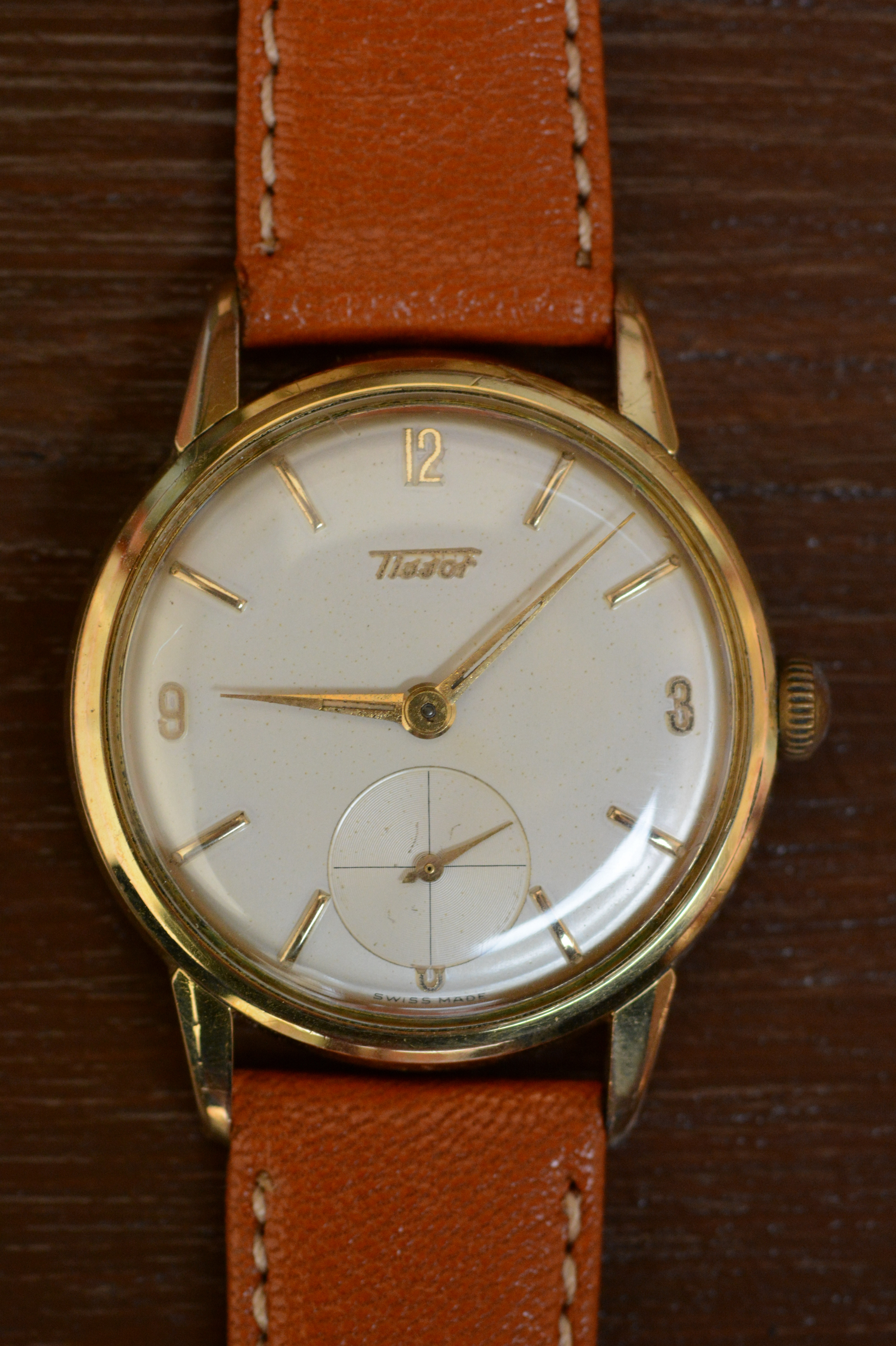
Tissot 1958

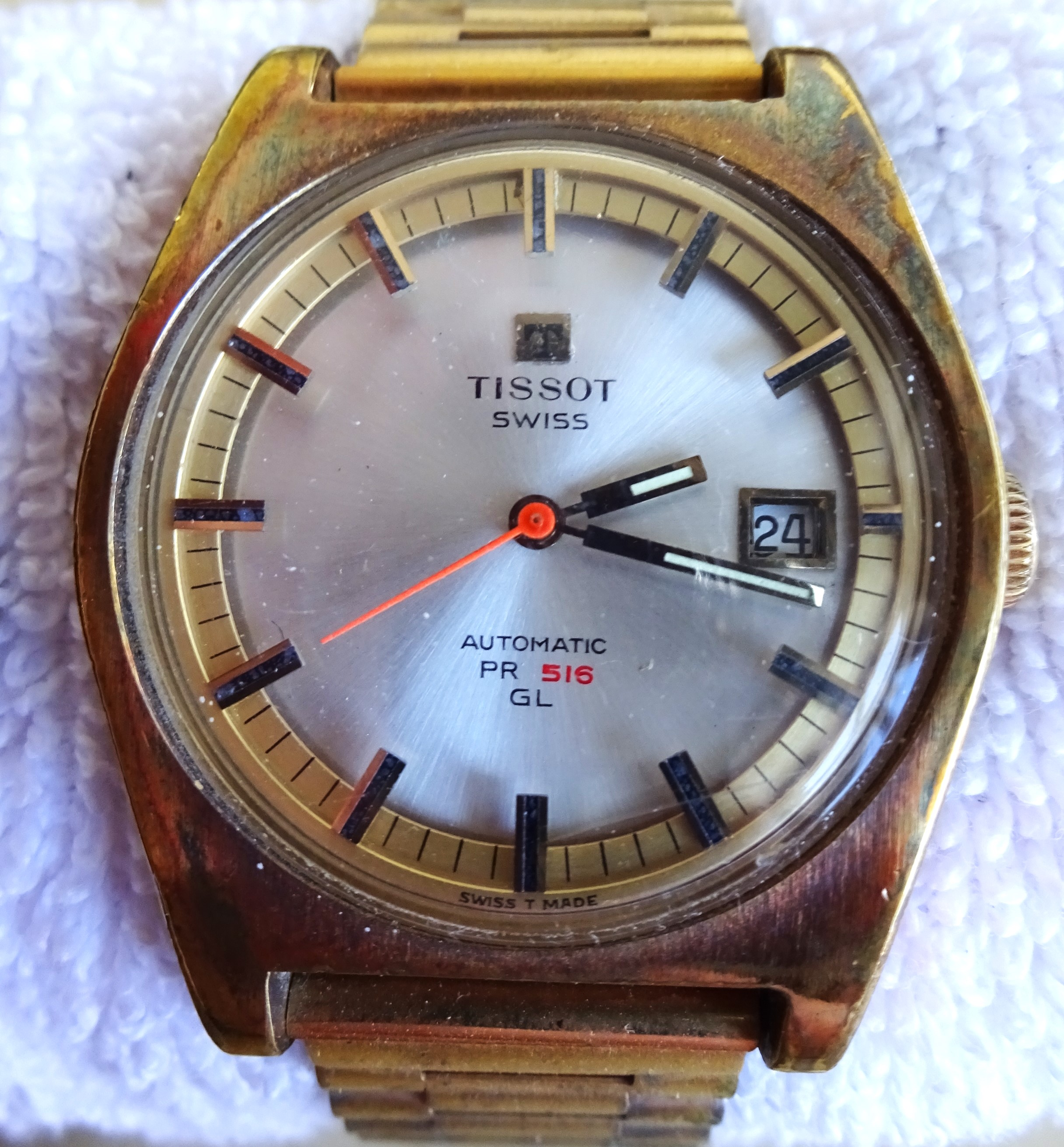
Tissot wristwatche Automatic PR 516 GL (1972)

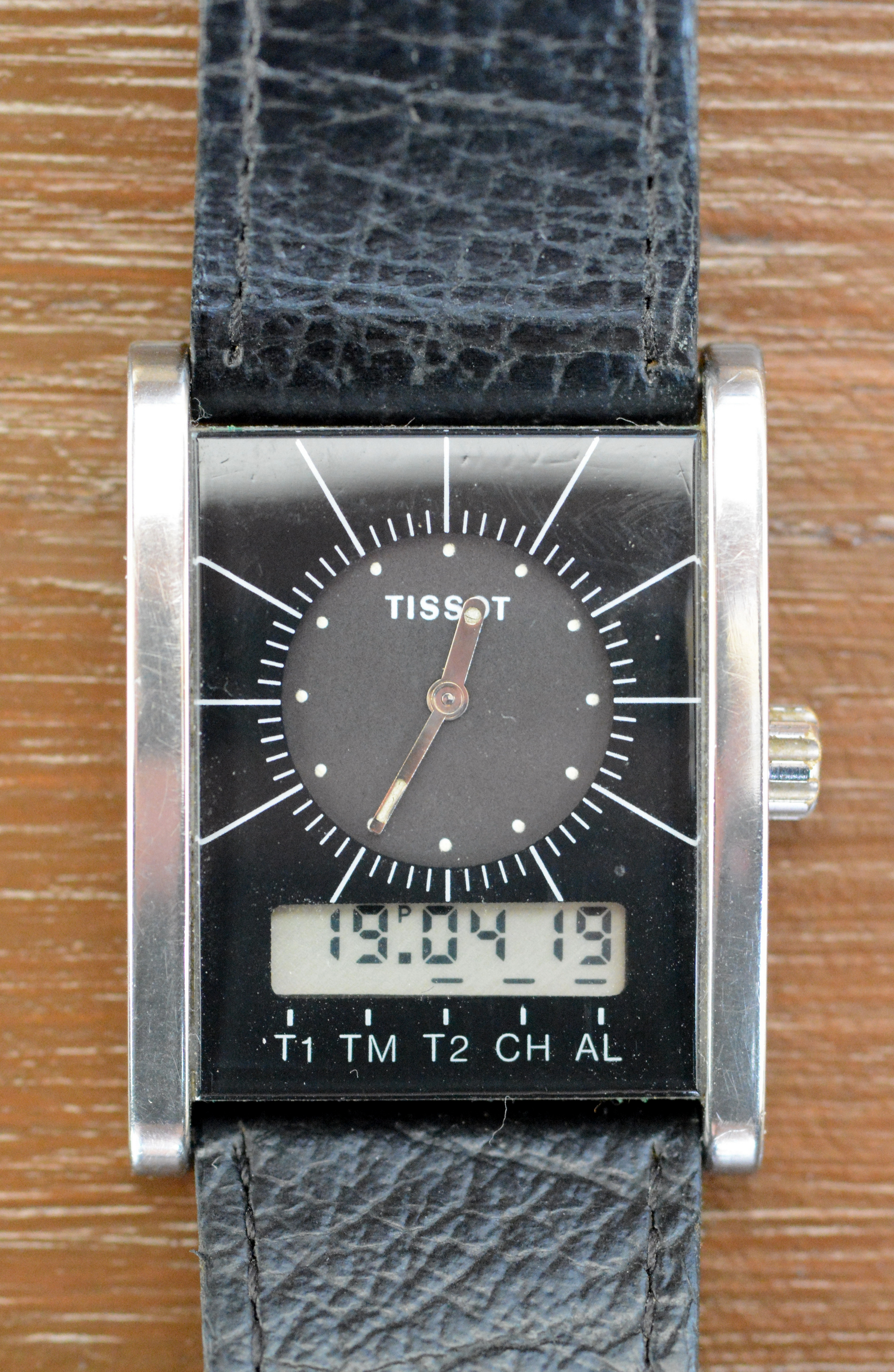
Tissot Twotimer, 1990

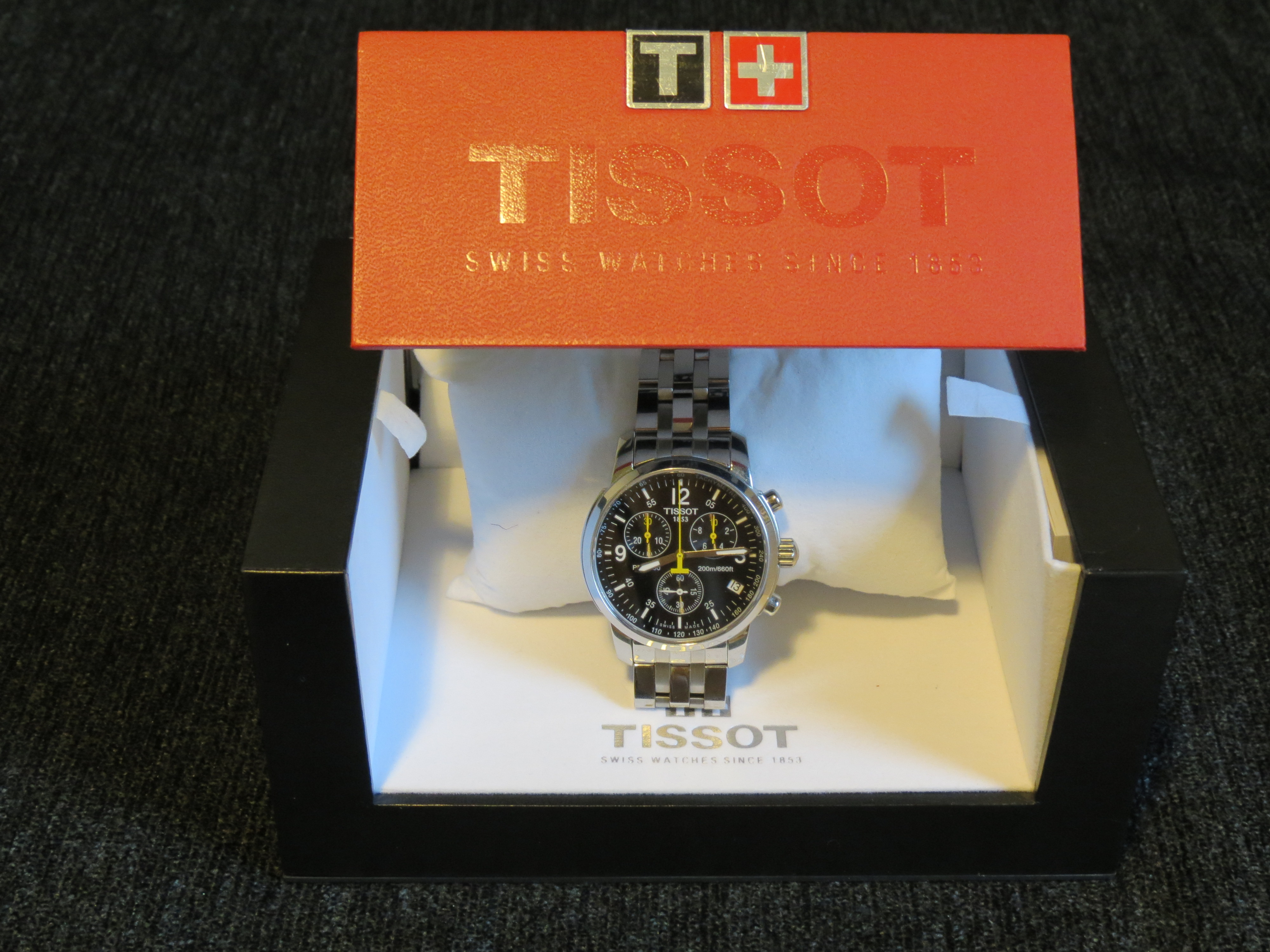
Tissot PRC 200 (T17.1.586.52)

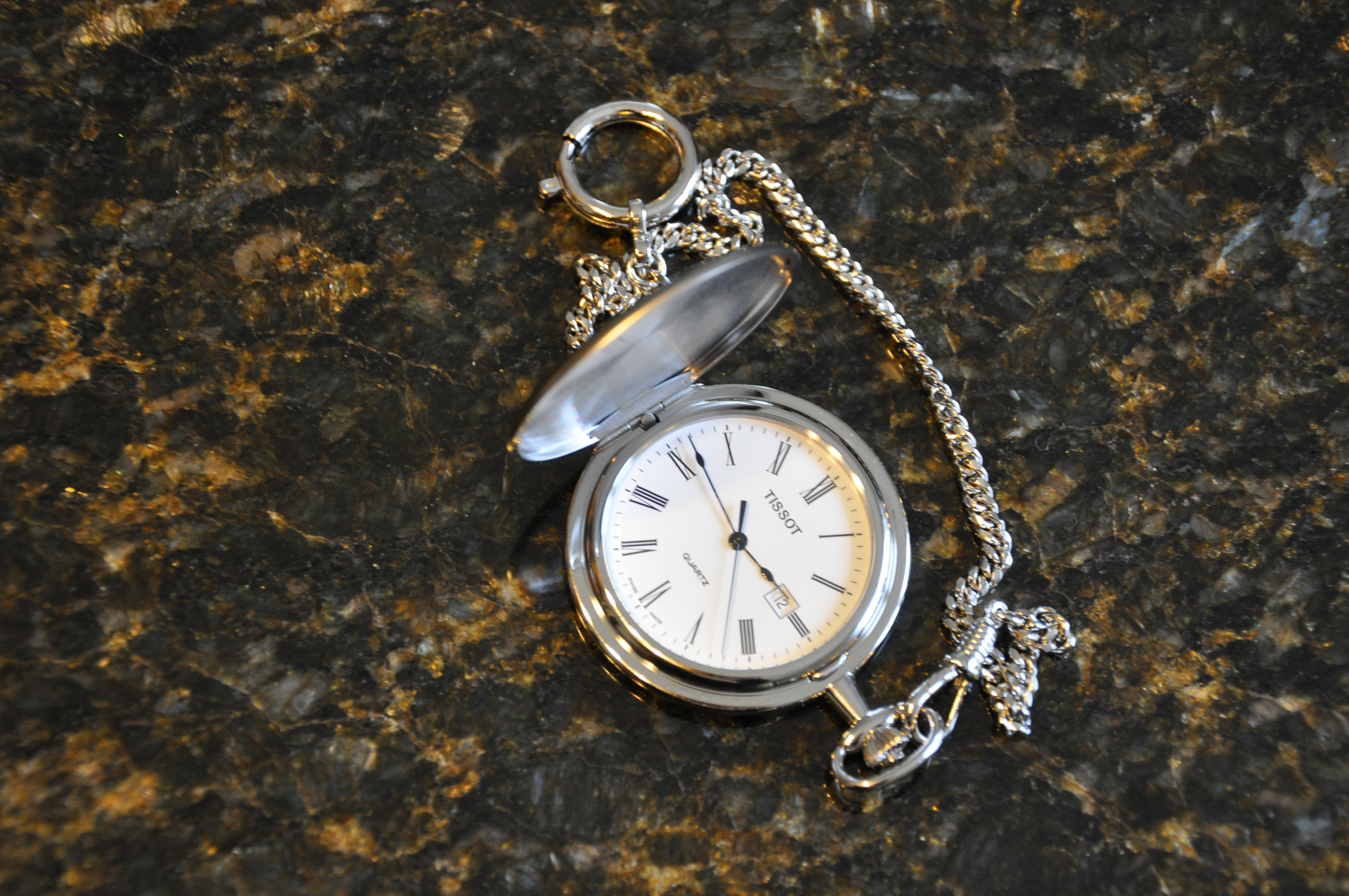
Tissot pocket watch, open

== Marketing ==
Tissot has partnered with a wide range of celebrities from basketball players, actors, cricket players, to MotoGP racers to be their brand ambassadors. Tissot brand ambassadors have included: Tony Parker, Liu Yi Fei, Virat Kohli, Deepika Padukone, Huang Xiaoming, Jorge Lorenzo, Thomas Lüthi, Neha Kakkar, Marc Márquez and Rana Daggubati, Simon Gong Jun.

Tissot has been the official timekeeping partner of the National Basketball Association since the 2015–16 NBA season (along with the WNBA), providing timing devices, including the on-court clock and shot clock for the league's venues, along with offering league-specific watches which are worn and promoted by the two league's players and coaches.

== Clientele ==
Tissot watches have been worn by Catherine, Princess of Wales, Sarah Bernhardt, singer Carmen Miranda, Grace Kelly, and Nelson Mandela.

== In popular culture ==
James Stewart wore a Tissot watch in Rear Window. T-Touch watches have been worn by Angelina Jolie in the movies Lara Croft Tomb Raider: The Cradle of Life and Mr. & Mrs. Smith. Simon Pegg wore a T-Touch in Mission: Impossible – Rogue Nation.. Richard Roundtree appears to wear a Tissot PR 516 with steel rally bracelet in Shaft. Indian actor Kamal Haasan wore a Tissot watch in 2008 Tamil film Dasavathaaram. In episode 13 of The Prisoner, Patrick McGoohan uses his Tissot watch to hypnotize the character "No.86".

== Sponsorships ==
Tissot has been the official timekeeper responsible for timing in several sports including MotoGP, the International Ice Hockey Federation, the Union Cycliste Internationale, the International Basketball Federation (FIBA), the International Fencing Federation, the Women's National Basketball Association, the NBA G League for many years. In basketball it has sponsored the Swiss national team, the Chinese Basketball Association, the NBA and other related events, teams, and organizations. On 20 November 2019 it was announced that Tissot would serve as the official timekeeper and results service for the 2022 World Games.

== See also ==
- List of watch manufacturers
- Swiss Made
