= Dickson Concepts =

Hong Kong luxury good company

- Native name: 廸生創建(國際)有限公司
- Type: Public
- Traded as: SEHK: 113
- Founded: Hong Kong (1980; 46 years ago)
- Headquarters: Hong Kong
- Key people: Dickson Poon, Executive Chairman
- Products: Retail, distribution
- Revenue: HK$3,635.6 million (2018)
- Operating income: HK$162.3 million (2018)
- Net income: HK$151.8 million (2018)
- Owner: Dickson Poon (55.7%)
- Number of employees: 1,433 (2018)
- Subsidiaries: Seibu (Mainland China & Hong Kong); Dickson Warehousing; Bertolucci SA; ST Dupont
- Website: www.dickson.com.hk

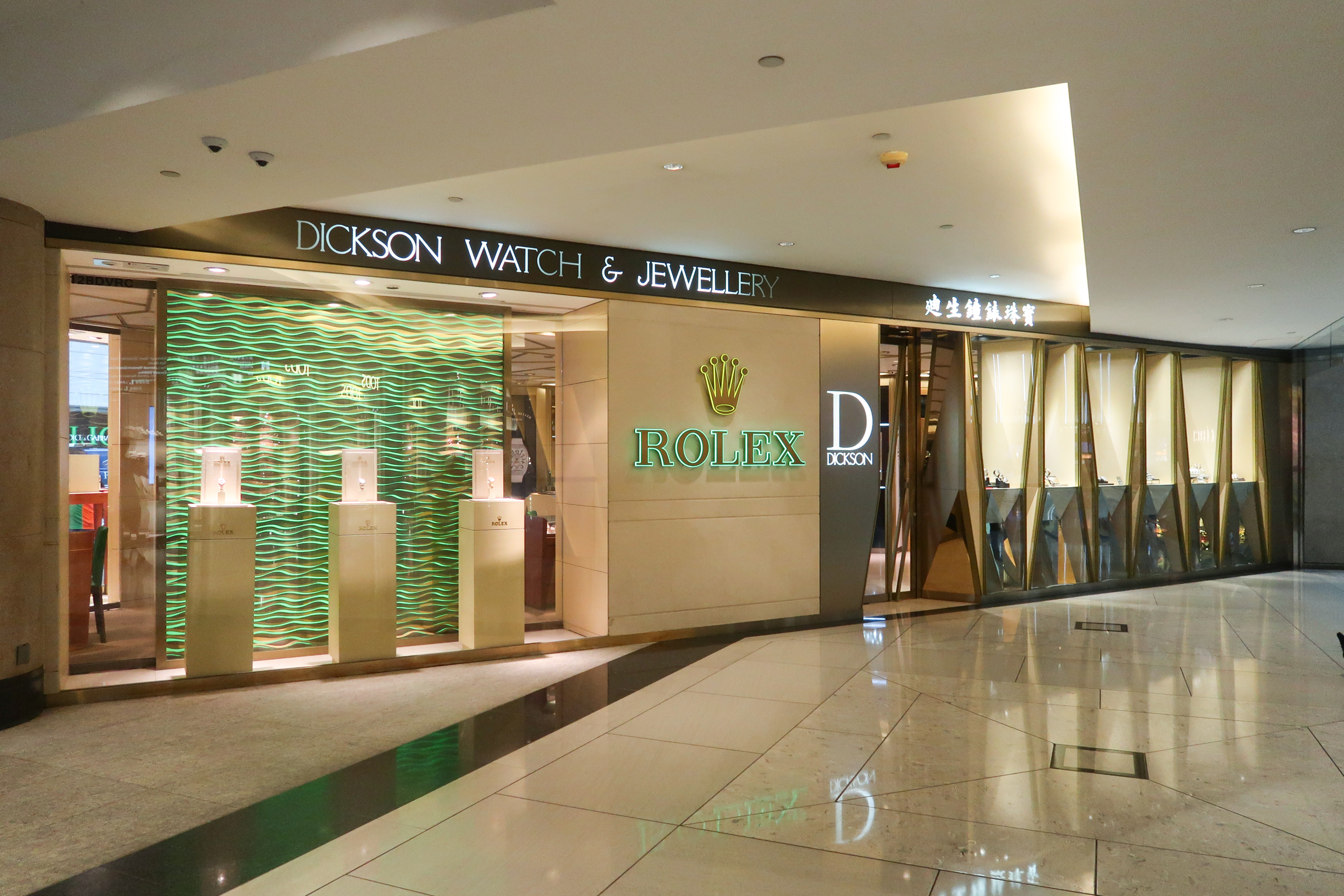
Dickson Watch & Jewellery at the Landmark, Central, Hong Kong

Dickson Concepts (International) Ltd. (DCIL) is a Hong Kong–based luxury goods company. The company is controlled by its founder and Executive Chairman Dickson Poon (潘廸生).

== History ==
The company Dickson Concepts was founded by Dickson Poon.

In 1991, the company acquired Harvey Nichols from Debenhams, part of the Burton Group.

In January 2005, the company announced the acquisition of Bertolucci SA, manufacturer and distributor of luxury Swiss watches.

In mid-February 2009, the company announced the end of its 20-plus year distributorship for Polo Ralph Lauren products in Asia effective 31 December 2009. The license is estimated by analysts to contribute 10 percent of its revenues.

In August 2026, the company sold Harvey Nichols to Frasers Group.

== Ownership ==
As of 30 September 2018, Dickson Poon controls 54.68% of the voting capital of DCIL through two trusts.
