= Mazlo =

Jewellery house in Paris, France

Mazlo is a jewellery house of Lebanese origin, established in Paris, France, in 1977.

Its origins date back to the fifteenth century, when the founder of the dynasty, Georgius Sayegh el-Mazloum, left Lebanon to settle in Venice.

Since the early-1970s, the house has been based in Parisand headed by Robert Mazloum, or Mazlo. A goldsmith and jeweller, he continued the family's traditions by creating one-of-a-kind bespoke jewellery pieces.

Along with his Haute Joaillerie pieces, he develops a line of prayer beads called "Masbahas" for the Gulf countries, distributed in Tanagra concept stores.

== See also ==
- Maximos III Mazloum, relative.
