= Harvey Nichols =

Department store in London, England

Coordinates: 51.5016°N 0.1598°W

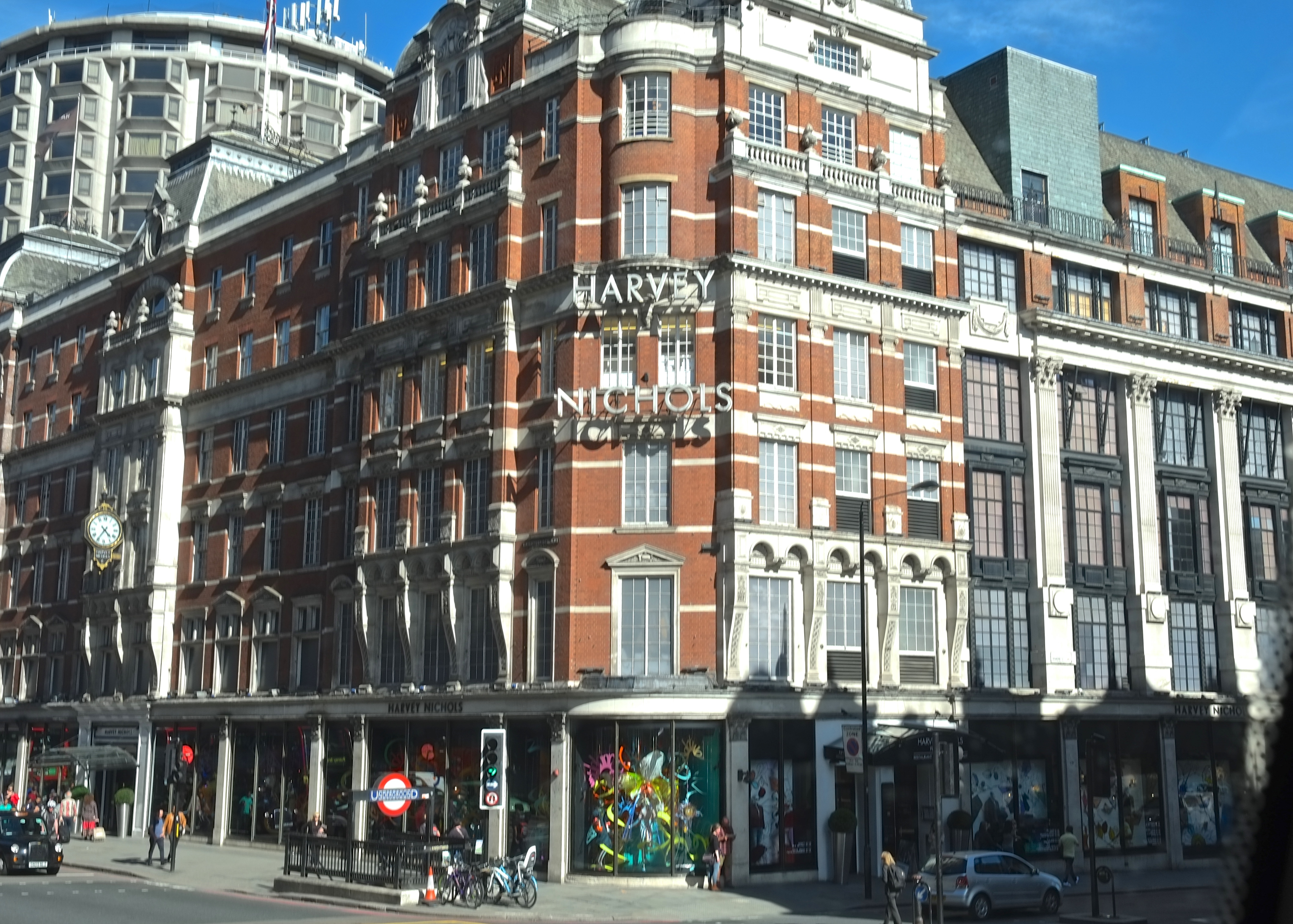
- Exterior of the flagship store in Knightsbridge (2017)
- Trade name: Harvey Nichols
- Type: Subsidiary
- Industry: Retail
- Genre: Department stores
- Founded: 1831; 195 years ago in London, England, United Kingdom
- Founder: Benjamin Harvey
- Headquarters: Shirebrook, England; 109–125 Knightsbridge, London, England, United Kingdom
- Number of locations: 11 (2026)
- Area served: United Kingdom; China; Kuwait; Qatar; Saudi Arabia; United Arab Emirates
- Key people: Julia Goddard (CEO)
- Owner: Frasers Group
- Parent: Frasers Group Trading Limited
- Website: harveynichols.com

Harvey Nichols is a British luxury department store chain founded in 1831 by Benjamin Harvey; it is headquartered both in Shirebrook and its flagship store in Knightsbridge, London. It sells designer fashion collections for men and women, fashion accessories, beauty products, fine wines and luxury foods. Previously owned by Hong Kong luxury goods company Dickson Concepts, it was acquired by Frasers Group in August 2026.

The chain has 11 locations worldwide across Hong Kong, Kuwait, Qatar, Saudi Arabia, the United Arab Emirates and the United Kingdom.

== History ==
The business was founded by Benjamin Harvey as a linen shop in Knightsbridge in 1831. Harvey died in 1850, leaving the business in the care of his wife Anne, who went into partnership with Harvey's son-in-law, James Nichols, to form Harvey Nichols & Co.

In 1889, the existing space was demolished to make way for a new department store. The building was designed by C. W. Stephens and built in stages between 1889 and 1894. In 1920, Harvey Nichols was purchased by Debenhams and, in 1985 Debenhams including Harvey Nichols was acquired by the Burton Group.

In October 1991, Dickson Poon of Dickson Concepts acquired Harvey Nichols from Debenhams (then part of the Burton Group) for £53.6 million.

Throughout its run in the 1990s and 2000s, Harvey Nichols was heavily mentioned in BBC comedy series Absolutely Fabulous, starring Jennifer Saunders and Joanna Lumley.

On 17 February 2014, Stacey Cartwright joined Harvey Nichols as chief executive officer of the Harvey Nichols Group of Companies. She replaced Joseph Wan, who held the position of chief executive officer for twenty-one years and who retired at the end of March 2014.

Cartwright left the company on 30 April 2018, handing over control of the company to Daniela Rinaldi and Manju Malhotra. Under their management, Harvey Nichols generated £229 million for the year to 30 March 2019, which marked a nine percent increase from the year before.

In November 2019, after Rinaldi resigned from the company, Malhotra, became sole chief operating officer, working closely with executive director Pearson Poon.

On 16 August 2023, it was announced that Malhotra would leave Harvey Nichols at the end of the year after working for the company for over twenty-five years. Pearson Poon was subsequently appointed vice chairman.

Kate Phelan was appointed as the brand's first-ever creative director in November 2024.

In June 2026, Dickson Poon put the company up for sale, with several Asian and American parties, and Next plc, Frasers Group and Modella Capital being interested in it. Frasers Group were previously interested in some of its stores.

On 9 August 2026, after Next and other bidders had withdrawn from the race to buy the company, Frasers Group became the sole bidder. Their plan was to rebrand its stores, other than its Knightsbridge and Edinburgh flagships, into Flannels or Frasers shops. Frasers Group's plan for the acquisition itself is to let Harvey Nichols collapse into administration, then it will acquire its assets such as its stores, brand and website, and then put them into its luxury division which encompasses Flannels and Frasers. Store space in the two remaining stores could be reduced to create space to feature other Frasers Group brands.

Frasers Group completed the purchase of the business on 13 August 2026. Its OXO restaurant was not sold to Frasers Group. Franchise agreements for international operations remain in place.

Harvey Nichols' only store in Ireland, located in Dublin, ceased trading on 13 August 2026. The company entered liquidation on the same day, following two decades of poor sales performance in the Republic of Ireland. Financial difficulties affecting its operations in both Ireland and the UK contributed to the decision. After no buyer was found for the Irish business, thirty-three employees lost their jobs. The remaining stock in Ireland was acquired by Frasers Group and is being sold through its branded stores until the stock is fully cleared. Despite initial plans to expand its presence in Ireland, Harvey Nichols failed to establish itself as a well-known brand in the Irish market. The company subsequently significantly reduced the size of its Dublin store several years before its eventual liquidation.

== Locations ==
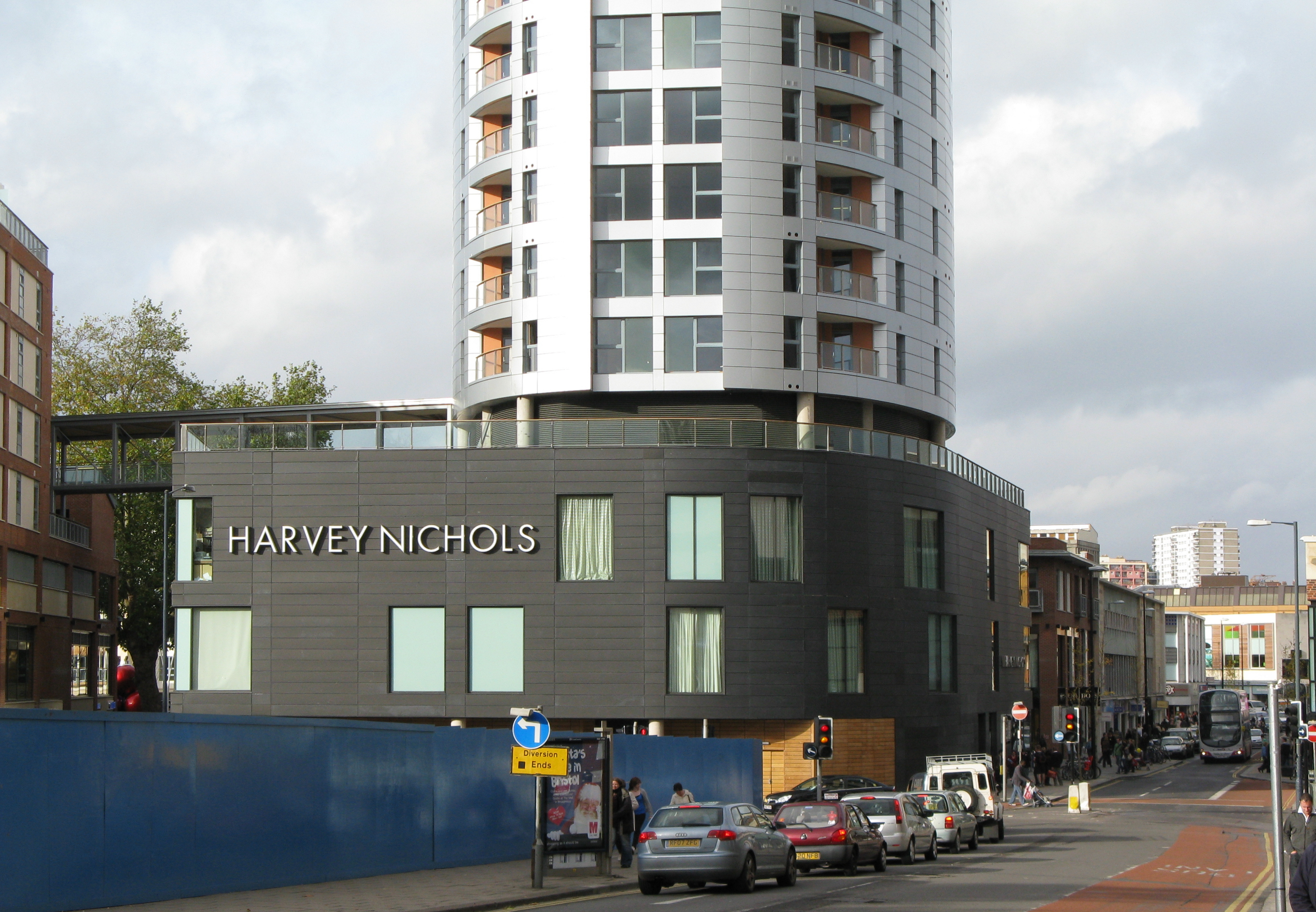
Harvey Nichols Bristol store at Cabot Circus opened in September 2008. The tower above is luxury flats.

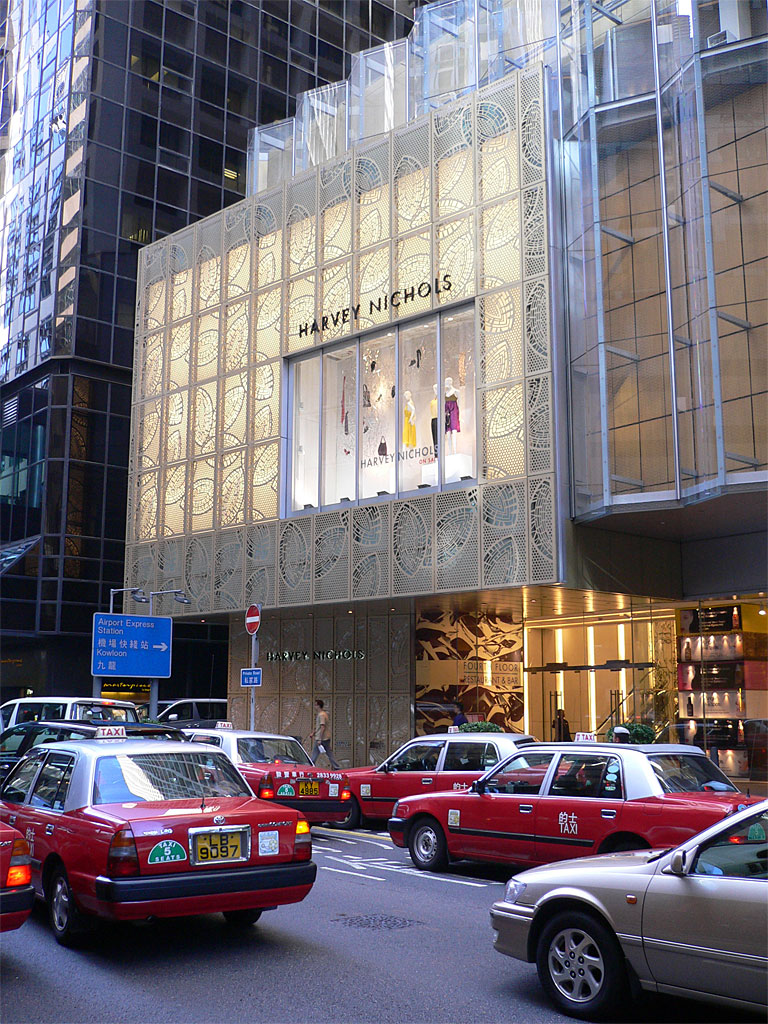
A branch store in Central, Hong Kong

The London flagship store is in Knightsbridge, a short distance from rival Harrods. In 1996 Harvey Nichols launched its first stand-alone restaurant in London, the OXO Tower Restaurant, Bar, and Brasserie, viewing the River Thames. OXO and three of the in-store restaurants were designed by London-based architects Lifschutz Davidson Sandilands. During the same year, Harvey Nichols opened its first store outside London in Leeds: a 60,000 sq ft (5,600 m^{2}) store in the 19th century Victoria Quarter, dubbed at the time "Knightsbridge of the North".

Due to the company's ambition to expand into Scotland, several potential locations were considered in Edinburgh and Glasgow. Eventually the company bought a site in St Andrew Square, Edinburgh, and the £32 million project was under way. The store opened in Summer 2002.

After the 1996 Manchester bombing in the centre of Manchester, the city underwent major redevelopment. Harvey Nichols announced in 2000 they would open a 100,000 sq ft (9,000 m^{2}) flagship store to help revive the city. The store opened in 2002 on New Cathedral Street, next door to its rival Selfridges which had opened a year earlier. Along with fashion, the Manchester store accommodates beauty, food, wine and a bar/brasserie on the second floor.

Harvey Nichols trialled a 22,000 square foot (2000 m^{2} "Beauty Bazaar" store in Manesty's Lane in the Liverpool One shopping area in 2012. The store has now become a permanent location for the company.

Harvey Nichols has had a presence at The Mailbox in Birmingham since 2001. In May 2013 they announced that they were to double the size of the store. The new store, a few doors down, covers 45,000 square feet, double the size of the existing store.

List of Harvey Nichols stores
| Country | City | Shopping center or district | Year opened | Year closed | Notes |
|---|---|---|---|---|---|
| Azerbaijan | Baku | | 2015 | 2015 | Converted to BARKERS after terminating licence agreement |
| China | Hong Kong | The Landmark | 2005 | 2023 | |
| China | Hong Kong | Pacific Place | 2011 | —N/a | |
| England | Birmingham | The Mailbox | 2001 | —N/a | |
| England | Bristol | Cabot Circus | 2008 | —N/a | |
| England | Leeds | Victoria Leeds | 1996 | —N/a | |
| England | Liverpool | Liverpool One | 2012 | 2025 | Beauty Bazaar |
| England | London | Knightsbridge | 1831 | —N/a | Flagship store |
| England | Manchester | New Cathedral Street | 2002 | —N/a | |
| Indonesia | Jakarta | Grand Indonesia | 2008 | 2010 | Operated by Mitra Adiperkasa |
| Ireland | Dublin | Dundrum Town Centre | 2005 | 2026 | Harvey Nichols Ireland entered liquidation on 13 August 2026 |
| Kuwait | Kuwait City | The Avenues | 2012 | —N/a | |
| Qatar | Doha | Doha Festival City | 2018 | —N/a | Operated by Al Maya Group of Companies |
| Saudi Arabia | Riyadh | Al-Faysaliyah Tower | 2000 | —N/a | |
| Scotland | Edinburgh | St. Andrew's Square | 2002 | —N/a | |
| Turkey | Istanbul | Kanyon Shopping Mall | 2006 | 2021 | Operated by DEMSA Group |
| Turkey | Istanbul | Ankara's Next Level | 2017 | 2020 | |
| United Arab Emirates | Dubai | Mall of the Emirates | 2006 | —N/a | Operated by Al Tayer Insignia |

== Controversies ==
Soon after opening a new store in Edinburgh in 2002, the managers faced an official complaint after staff tried to stop a homeless man selling the Big Issue magazine outside.

In mid-2003 objections were made to a Harvey Nichols magazine advertisement that appeared in Vogue, Elle and Harpers & Queen and on a poster. The complainants objected that the advertisement was irresponsible, because it showed unsafe driving and was offensive to people who had been, or who knew people who had been involved in road accidents.

In September 2013, Harvey Nichols resumed the sale of fur in its United Kingdom stores following a decade-long embargo. The decision attracted much criticism, focusing on the way animals were treated. The company denied allegations of cruelty and insisted its furs are ethically sourced from reputable suppliers.
