= Marjorie Yang =

Hong Kong businesswoman (born 1952)

Marjorie Yang Mun-tak
- 楊敏德
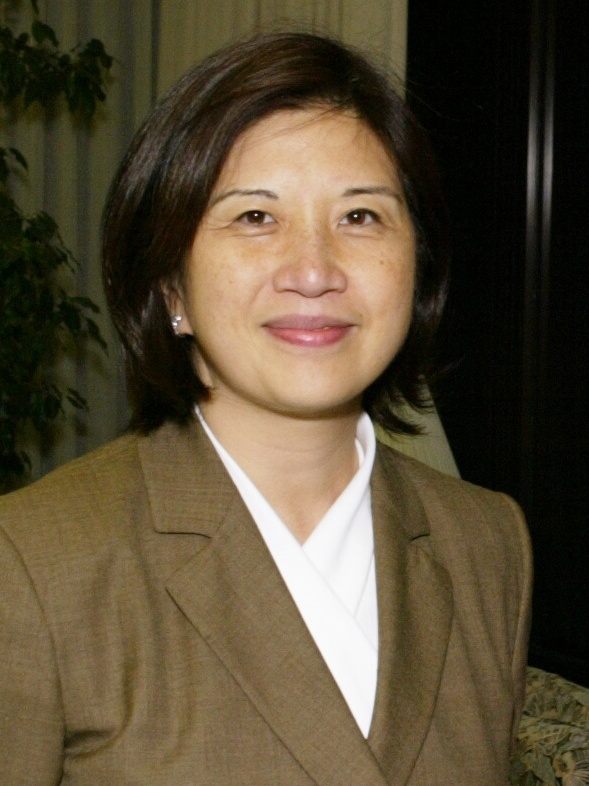
- Yang in 2004
- Born: 29 June 1952 (age 74)
- Education: Massachusetts Institute of Technology; Harvard School of Business
- Occupations: Chairman and CEO of Esquel Group
- Office: Chairman, Esquel Group
- Children: 1
- Parent: Yang Yuan-Loong (father)

Marjorie Yang Mun-tak
- Traditional Chinese: 楊敏德
- Simplified Chinese: 杨敏德
Transcriptions
Standard Mandarin
- Hanyu Pinyin: Yáng Mǐndé
Yue: Cantonese
- Jyutping: joeng4 man5 dak1

Marjorie Yang Mun-tak GBS (Chinese: 楊敏德; born 1952) is Chairwoman of Esquel Group, a Hong Kong–based textile and apparel manufacturer with operations throughout the world, producing over 110 million cotton shirts every year for well-acclaimed brands and retailers such as Ralph Lauren, Tommy Hilfiger, Hugo Boss, Nike, and Marks and Spencer.

== Career ==
Yang is of Wu County, Jiangsu descent. She is the eldest daughter of Yang Yuanlong, founder of the Hong Kong textile company Esquel Group. She has served as its chairwoman since 1995. From 2008 to 2014, Yang oversaw a rapid expansion of the family business she inherited, more than doubling its revenue to US$1.4 billion.

In China, Yang has been a Member of the National Committee of the Chinese People's Political Consultative Conference since 2003. In Hong Kong, she is Chairman of the Hong Kong-United States Business Council, Chairperson of the Government's Advisory Committee on Admission of Quality Migrants and Professionals as well as a member of the Government's Commission on Strategic Development. In addition, Marjorie serves as Deputy Chairman of the Seoul International Business Advisory Council.

Yang is also on the boards of The HSBC and Swire Pacific as Independent non-executive director. In addition, she is a Member of Christie's Asia Advisory Board.

In 2017, Yang financially backed former finance minister and colleague John Tsang for the position of Chief Executive of Hong Kong, though he eventually lost to Carrie Lam.

Yang is a Member of the various advisory boards at:

- MIT Corporation
- Chairman of the Council of the Hong Kong Polytechnic University
- Member of the Board of Governors at the Asia School of Business
- Harvard University
- Harvard Business School
- MIT Sloan School of Management
- Tsinghua University School of Economics and Management
- China Europe International Business School
- Shanghai Jiao Tong University Antai College of Economics & Management
- Honorary Trustee at Lingnan College of Sun Yat-sen University
- Honorary Member of the Court of the Hong Kong University of Science and Technology

== Education ==
Yang holds a Bachelor of Science in Mathematics from the Massachusetts Institute of Technology and an MBA from Harvard Business School.

== Personal life ==
From her marriage to businessman Dickson Poon, Yang has one child, Dee Poon. Yang brought her daughter into the Esquel Group in 2009 as chief brand officer of PYE, and Dee Poon has since become managing director of Esquel brands and distribution.

== Philanthropy and environmental conservation ==
Her Esquel-Y.L. Yang Education Foundation has been funding the building or renovation of more than 20 schools. The Esquel Group has provided microfinance to 300 rural households in China's unrest-ridden Xinjiang region, where the privately held company has cotton farming, ginning and spinning operations. The Foundation is geared mostly towards improving the standards of teaching, encouraging education and learning, and enhancing health and public hygiene for Uyghur minority students in areas outside the regional capital, Ürümqi. The foundation has been doing work in vision screening amongst rural children in China, and has also done work in Vietnam, and Sri Lanka.

Long an advocate for environmental conservation and sustainable production, Marjorie also chairs the Shan Shui Conservation Center and holds membership in the Advisory Council of Natural Resources Defense Council (NRDC) in China.

In 2018, Yang announced the launch of 'Integral', an initiative aimed to encourage business leaders and academics to develop a balanced and less environment-damaging growth model for China.

== Recent honours and awards ==
- Top 50 Most Powerful Women in Business by Fortune Magazine (2000, 2004, 2005 and 2009)
- The Bronze Beaver Award by Massachusetts Institute of Technology (MIT) Alumni Association (2011)
- 48 Heroes of Philanthropy (2012)
- Asia's 50 Power Businesswomen by Forbes (2012)
- Diamond Award by Hong Kong Tatler (2013)
- Gold Bauhinia Star (GBS) by the Hong Kong Special Administrative Region Government (2013)
