= RockWatch =

Wristwatch brand by Tissot

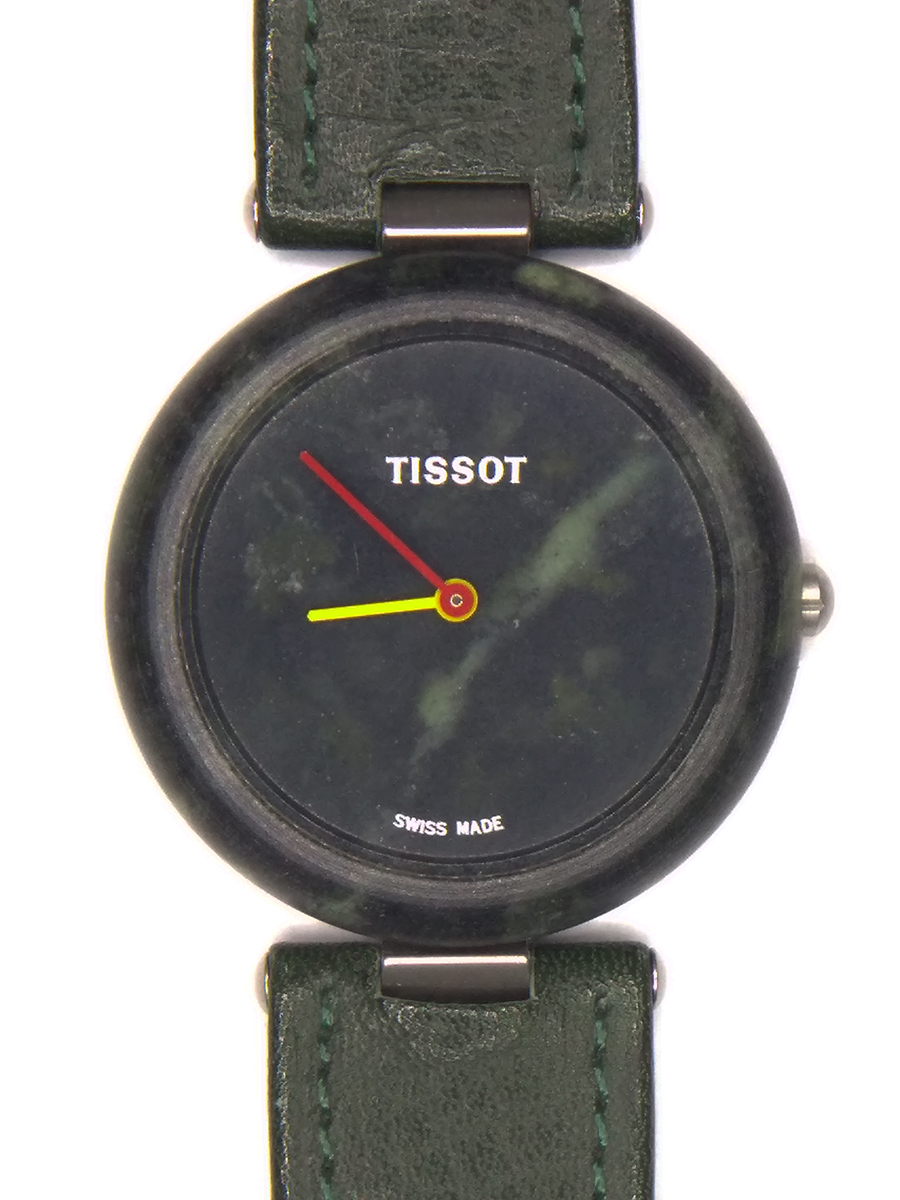
Fig.1: Men's R151 dark green, front crown with groove

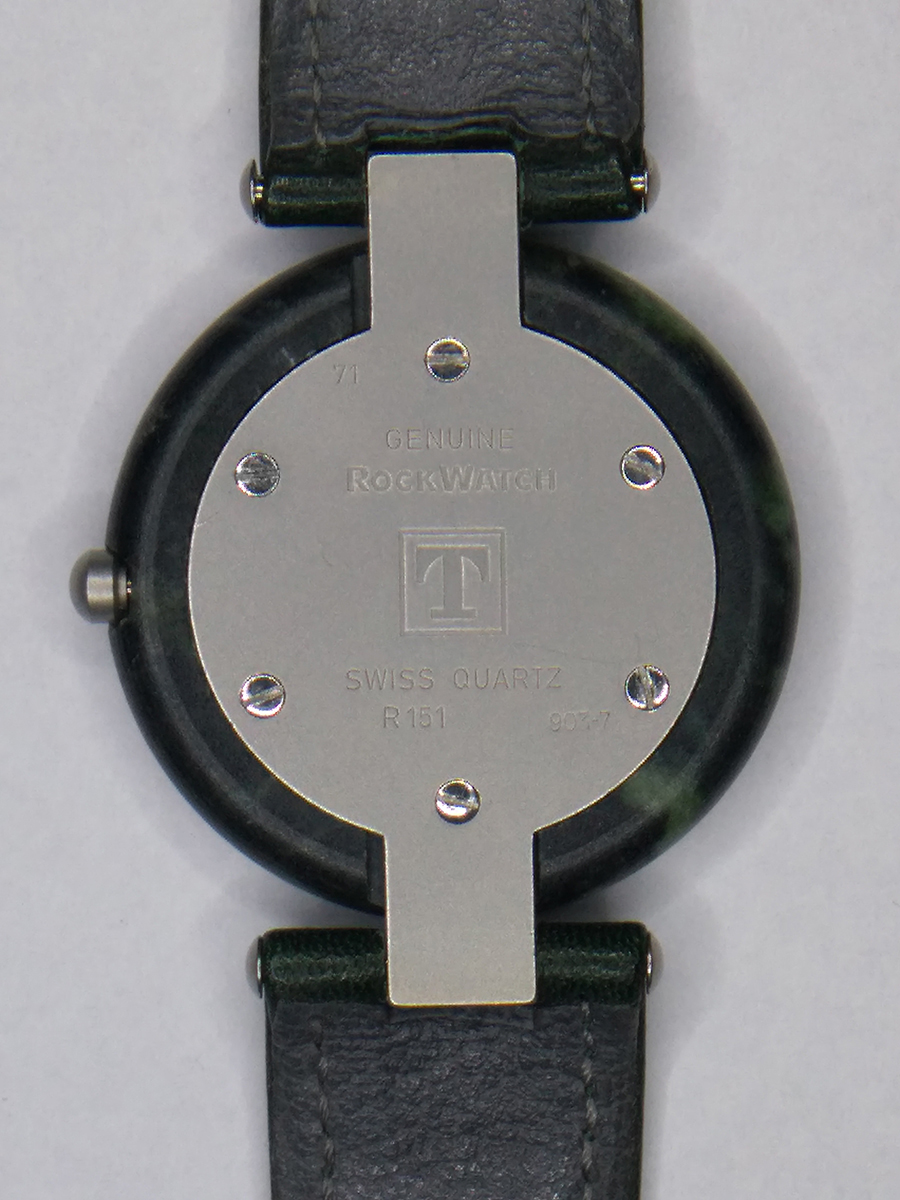
Fig.2: Men's R151 dark green, back original embossed lettering

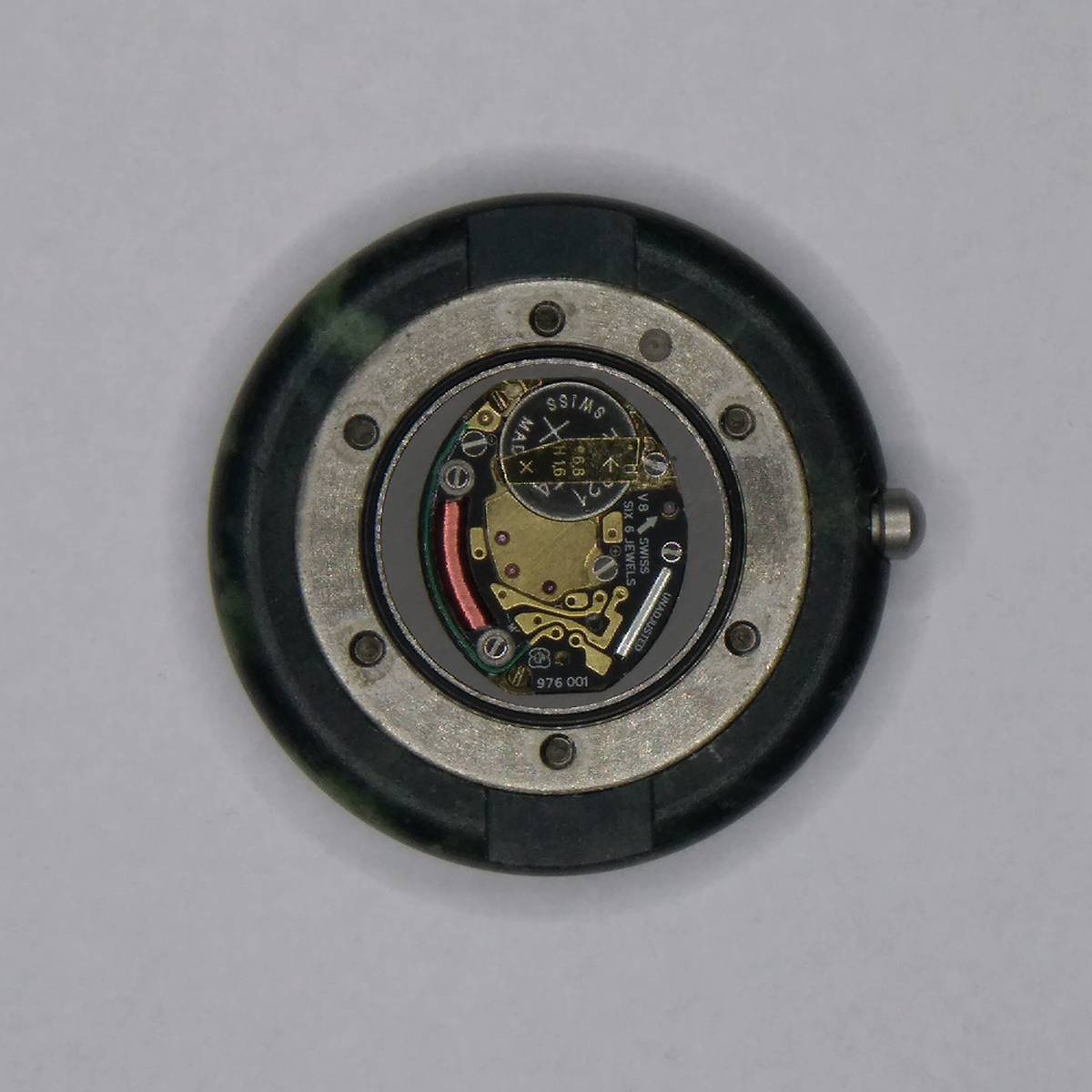
Fig.3: Men's R151 dark green, inside seal and battery installed

The RockWatch or Rock Watch was a trademarked brand of wristwatch by Tissot with a case essentially made of stone, initially alpine granite from the Grisons, Ticino, and Valais cantons of Switzerland. It was designed by Robert Mazlo and first introduced to the U.S. market in December 1985 and in Switzerland March 1986. Tissot claims it was the world's first wristwatch with a case made of natural stone. The cavities for the movement and dial face were milled from both sides, making the dial an integral part of the case. The straps were fixed to the back plate on both ends thus preventing mechanical stress to the stone.

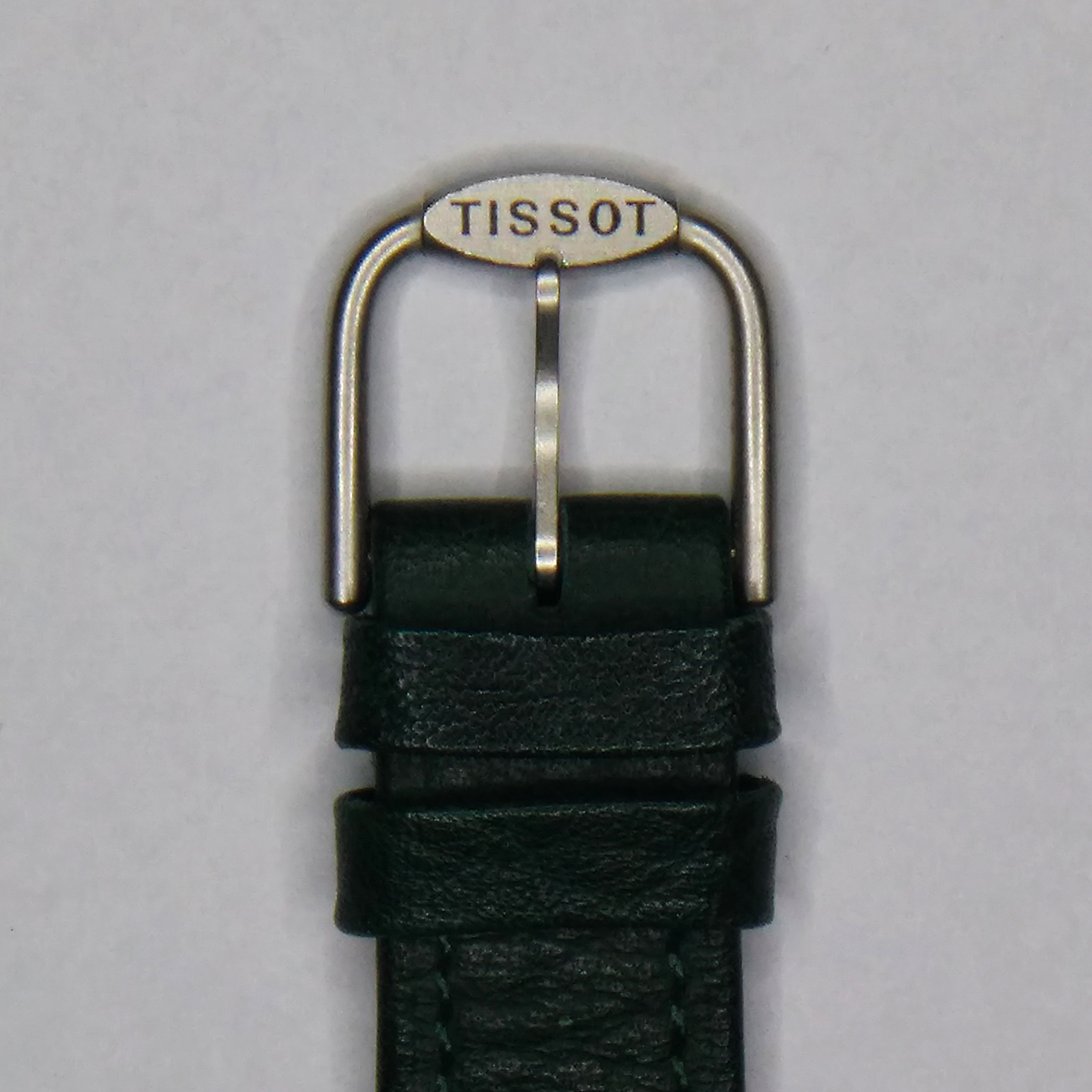
Fig.4: Men's R151 dark green, original strap buckle

Later versions of the watch used different stones from various mountainous areas around the world including alabaster, aventurine (Brazil), basalt (Scandinavia), blue lace agate, blue sodalite (Brazil), lapis lazuli (Italy), magnesite, picture jasper (Kalahari desert), pink rhodonite (Australia), quartz, and thulite. Some pieces received decorative dial inserts such as sectors from prehistoric clamophyllia coral (Jura mountains) as a premium option.

Backplate lettering was originally embossed and "RockWatch" written in capitalized form (see Fig.2); some laser-engraved pieces were sold at some point later on. The final batches were fitted with a slightly redesigned embossed plate with a modernized T-logo and "rockwatch" in lower case letters (see Fig.5).

The original stone design was followed up by a similar watch with mother-of-pearl cases commonly nicknamed PearlWatch, while the backplates continued to carry the RockWatch name.

It was ultimately succeeded by the WoodWatch, made from exotic timbers and in larger case sizes (33 mm / 38.5 mm).

Tissot RockWatch
Country of origin	Switzerland
Production	1985 to 1992
Case material	natural stone
Case diameter (excluding crown)	23 mm (R140 Ladies' size) 30 mm (R150 Unisex size) 33 mm (R151 Men's size)
Lens	sapphire crystal
Back plate	stainless steel (matte finish) attached with 6 screws
Crown	stainless steel (matte finish on granite cases)
Strap material	leather (standard) natural stone (optional bracelet style)
Strap width	R140: 10 mm R150: 16 mm R151: 18 mm
Strap buckle	pin fastening
Water resistance	none
Movement	ETA 976.001 quartz, 6 jewels, 32 kHz, Swiss-made
Power source	IEC SR65 battery, originally Renata SR616SW

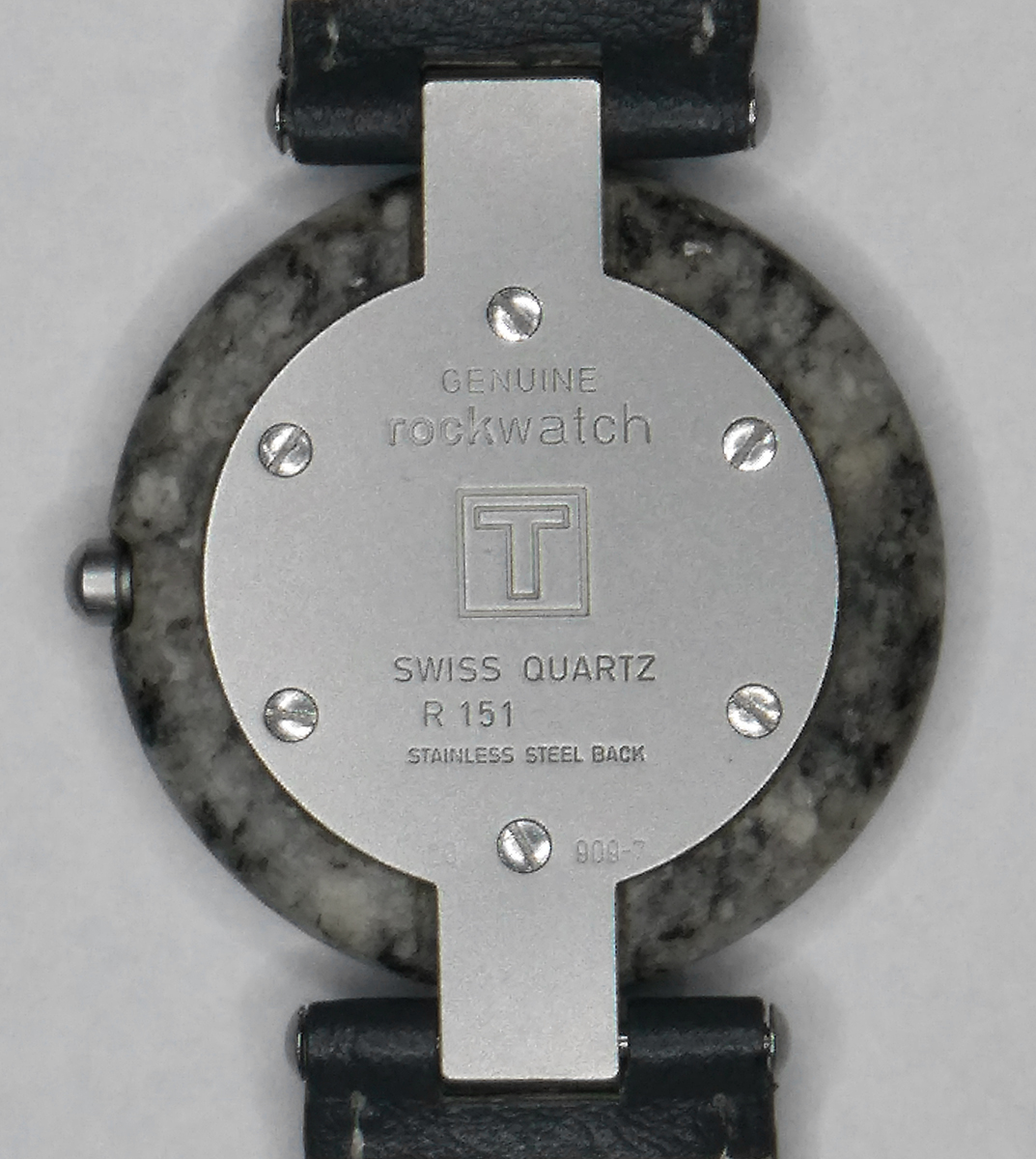
Fig.5: Men's R151 white&black, back late issue redesign

Early pieces have red (minute) and yellow (hour) hands, the colors of Swiss hiking trails markers. Later issues of the R150 size have green and black hands, and many different combinations followed suit. Towards the end of production, gold/gold was used regularly.

The R150/R151's smooth rounded crown has a matte stainless steel finish on standard granite pieces, with a single distinctive groove (see Fig.1) whereas the small R140's flat crown is knurled for ease of use. Late issues feature a variety of different crown finishes, while the shapes were kept throughout.

Leather straps with Tissot-marked buckles were standard (see Fig.4) while bracelet-style straps made from the same stone as the case were later introduced as a premium option. The straps are held by proprietary pins.

When introduced, the standard granite/leather versions of the intermediate size retailed for $195 in the U.S., and CHF 350 in Switzerland. Over 500,000 were sold. Giant clocks sculpted authentically after the watch case by contract artist Felice Bottinelli could be seen in jewellers' shop windows all over Switzerland, adding to the recognition of this product.

Product support was terminated around 2006.
