= Esquel Group =

Chinese textile and apparel manufacturer

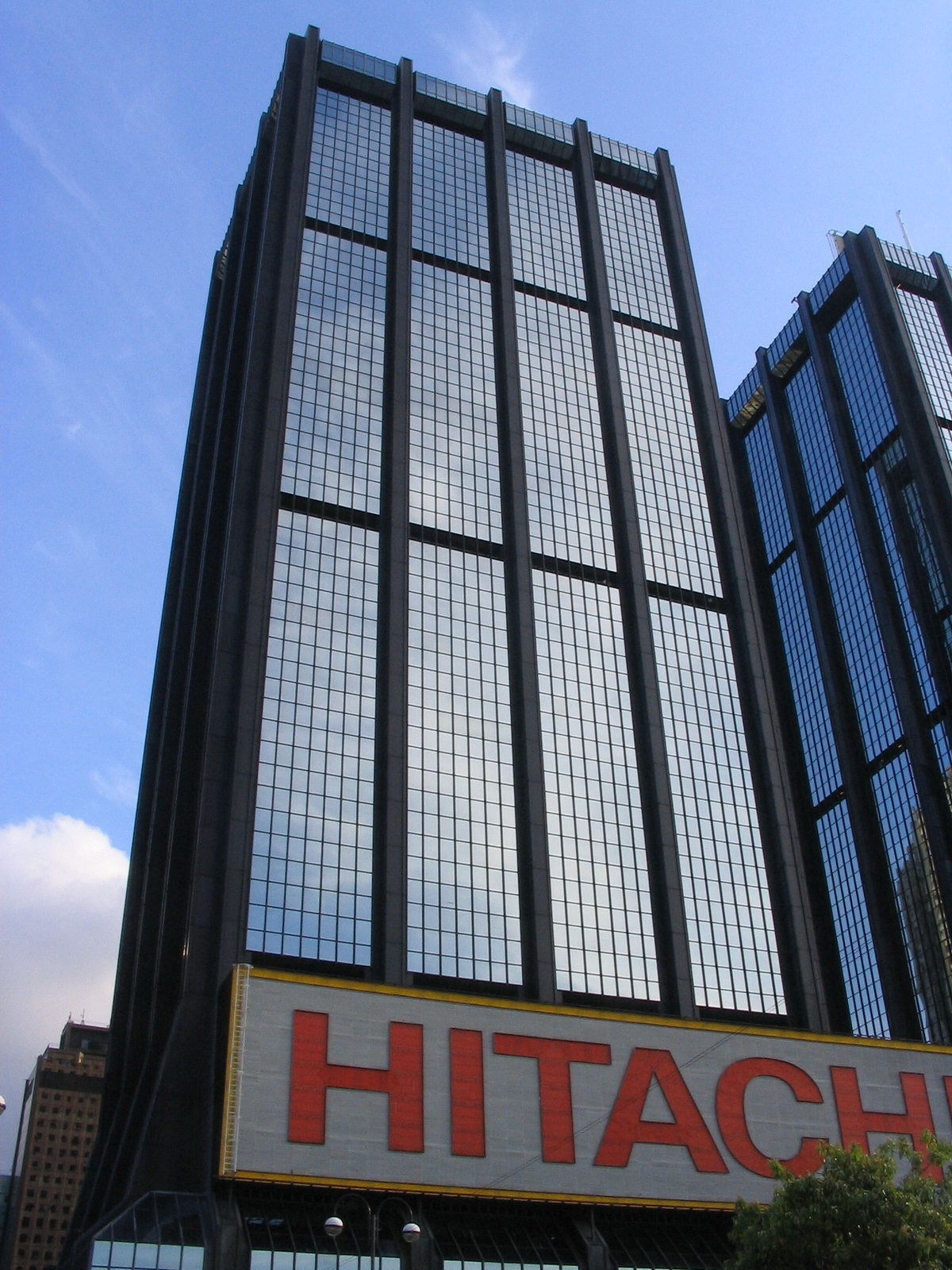
- Company headquarters at the Harbour Centre, Wan Chai, Hong Kong
- Native name: 溢達集團
- Company type: Private
- Industry: Textiles
- Founder: Yang Yuanlong
- Headquarters: Hong Kong
- Key people: Marjorie Yang (Chair)
- Number of employees: 35,200
- Website: www.esquel.com

Esquel Group
- Traditional Chinese: 溢達集團
- Simplified Chinese: 溢达集团
Transcriptions
Standard Mandarin
- Hanyu Pinyin: Yì Dá Jítuán
Yue: Cantonese
- Jyutping: jat6 daat6 zaap6 tyun4

Esquel Group (Chinese: 溢達集團) is a Hong Kong–based textile and apparel manufacturer. It is one of the largest producers of woven shirts globally. Its head office is in Harbour Centre (海港中心), Wan Chai, Hong Kong.

== History ==
Esquel was founded in 1978 by Yang Yuan-loong. According to one of his daughters, the decision to establish the company was influenced by China's reform and opening up that year. Esquel supplies textiles to companies such as Nike, Tommy Hilfiger, Li Ning, ANTA Sports, Fila, Giordano, Muji.

=== U.S. sanctions ===
In July 2020, the United States Department of Commerce placed a Hong Kong–based subsidiary of Esquel Group on the Bureau of Industry and Security's Entity List for alleged use of forced labor of Uyghurs in Xinjiang. In July 2021, Esquel filed a lawsuit in the United States District Court for the District of Columbia against the U.S. government seeking removal from the Entity List. In August 2021, Esquel was removed, with conditions, from the Entity List by the inter-agency End-User Review Committee, which is composed of representatives from the U.S. Departments of Commerce, State, Defense, Energy, and Treasury. Several weeks later, Esquel resumed its lawsuit after failing to reach an agreement with the U.S. Commerce Department regarding the timetable for removal and the specifics of the conditions for removal. In November 2024, U.S. authorities added Esquel Group to a list of entities prohibited from importing into the United States under the Uyghur Forced Labor Prevention Act.

== Facilities ==
Most of the company's manufacturing facilities are located in mainland China. Like much of the textile industry in the country, Esquel has faced rising labor costs and stricter environmental regulations. To address these pressures, the company has invested in upgrading and automating facilities, rather than shifting production abroad. This approach was noted by the South China Morning Post as different from some competitors that sought lower-cost locations overseas.
