= S. T. Dupont =

French luxury goods manufacturing company

S.T. Dupont S.A.
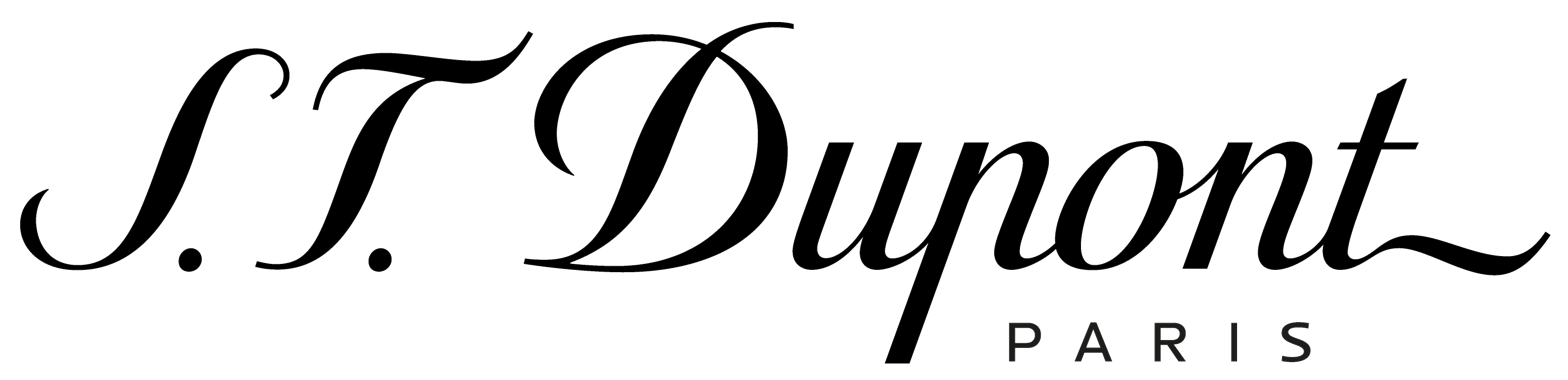
- Type: Private (1872–1971); Subsidiary (1971–present)
- Traded as: CAC All-Share
- Industry: Luxury goods
- Founded: 1872; 154 years ago
- Founder: Simon Tissot-Dupont
- Fate: Acquired by Gillette in 1971 Acquired by Dickson Concepts in 1987
- Headquarters: Paris, France
- Products: Bags, lighters, pens, watches
- Operating income: USD 50 million (1986)
- Parent: Dickson Concepts
- Website: st-dupont.com

S.T. Dupont is a French manufacturing company based in Paris, which has been making luxury goods since its founding in 1872. Products commercialised include handbags, lighters, collectible pens, perfumes (produced under license by Interparfums), cigarettes (made by Philip Morris International), and recently other gadgets using the trademark diamond-head pattern.

It is a wholly owned subsidiary of Hong Kong luxury goods company Dickson Concepts.

== History ==
Simon Tissot-Dupont (born in Savoy in 1847) founded a carriage company which was destroyed in a fire in 1872. The same year, he bought a workshop which made leather briefcases for diplomats and businessmen. In 1884, Dupont became the supplier to one of the world's largest shops – Les Grands Magasins du Louvre – while maintaining his private clientele.

Dupont handed over his company in 1919 to his sons, Lucien and André, who, trading under the name of Les Fils de S.T. Dupont (the Sons of S.T. Dupont), relaunched the activity. They focused on high-quality travel cases and accessories. Craftsmen were employed and patents were taken out to protect industrial secrets. 250 workers and 17 separate traders were involved in the manufacture, including goldsmiths, woodworkers, engravers, leather craftsmen, lacquer workers, and locksmiths.

S.T. Dupont transferred its workshops from Rue Dieu in Paris back to the family's hometown of Faverges in Savoy in 1924. In 1929, Lucien Tissot-Dupont was invited to New York by Louis Cartier to present his travel cases in their Fifth Avenue shop. On the ship going to New York, he learned about the Wall Street crash. In response, on his subsequent return to Paris, he decided to move even further upmarket and cater to clients unaffected by the crash.

In 1971, Gillette purchased 48% of the stock of S.T. Dupont. In 1987, the company was sold to Dickson Concepts, a Hong Kong retailer of fashion products, watches and jewellery, as part of a restructuring plan announced by Gillette.

== Products ==
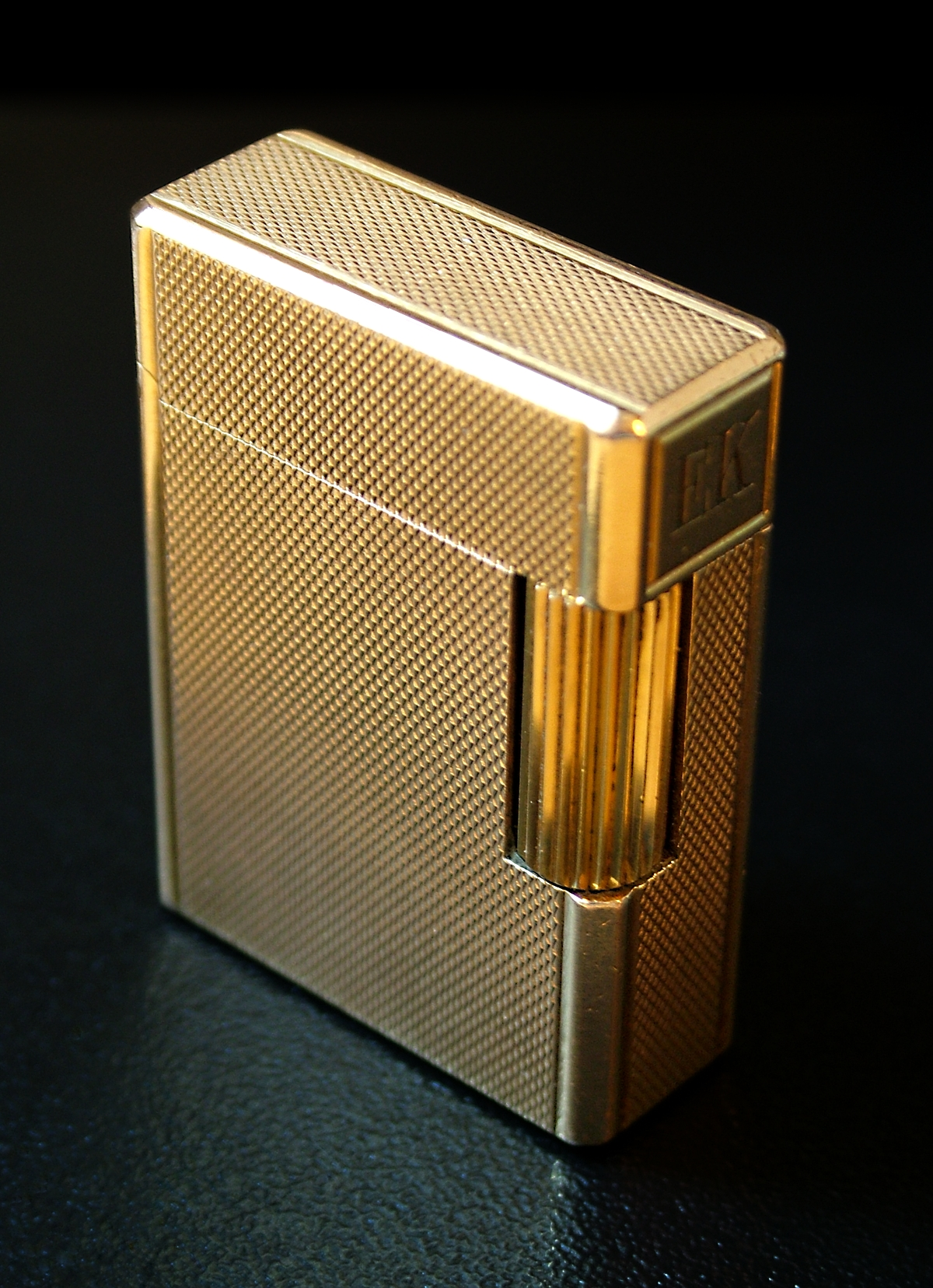
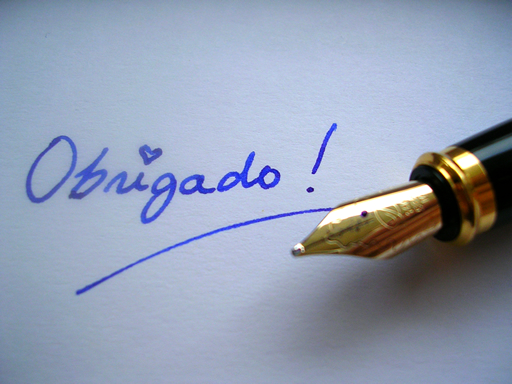
Dupont lighter (left) and fountain pen

Dupont has gone on to produce lighters, pens, wallets, watches, cigarette (made by Philip Morris International) and fragrances. The company's first serially-produced lighter was created in 1941 and was made of aluminium, as brass was used as a strategic metal restricted for war purposes only.

== Lighter models of S.T. Dupont ==
S.T. Dupont initially produced luxury travel cases, sporadically they received orders for a custom lighter to be included. Between the period of 1935-1941 the French brand produced two models: Le Sultan and a closed lid lighter. Le Sultan was available in as Laque de Chine finish and as a silver-plated lighter. The closed lid lighter was available in silver-plating.

In 1939 S.T. Dupont received an order from the Maharajah of Patiala; Yadavindra Singh. He ordered five solid gold minaudières for his mistresses. These cases usually had a friction strip to create a light for a cigarette. The Maharajah however, asked S.T. Dupont to include a pocketsized petrol lighter instead. Thus Dupont began producing a new lighter, which was completed in 1941.

As war broke out across Europe, the brand saw a sharp decrease in orders of travel cases. To survive it turned to producing lighters, as those were relatively cheap to make and costed substantial labour hours to complete. With this trick they were able to survive and keep their staff from being laid off. Since access to brass was restricted, S.T. Dupont turned to the use of an aluminum-based alloy. 6 January 1941 at 9.25 am, S.T. Dupont applied for a patent on a petrol lighter design.

Post-war, S.T. Dupont kept lighters in production as they were a great success. In this period they switched to engine turning to create deeper reliefs in the now again widely available brass. this led to the creation of the Windsor pattern (1945) and the Jeroboam lighter (1945)
