= Hotan Cultural Museum =

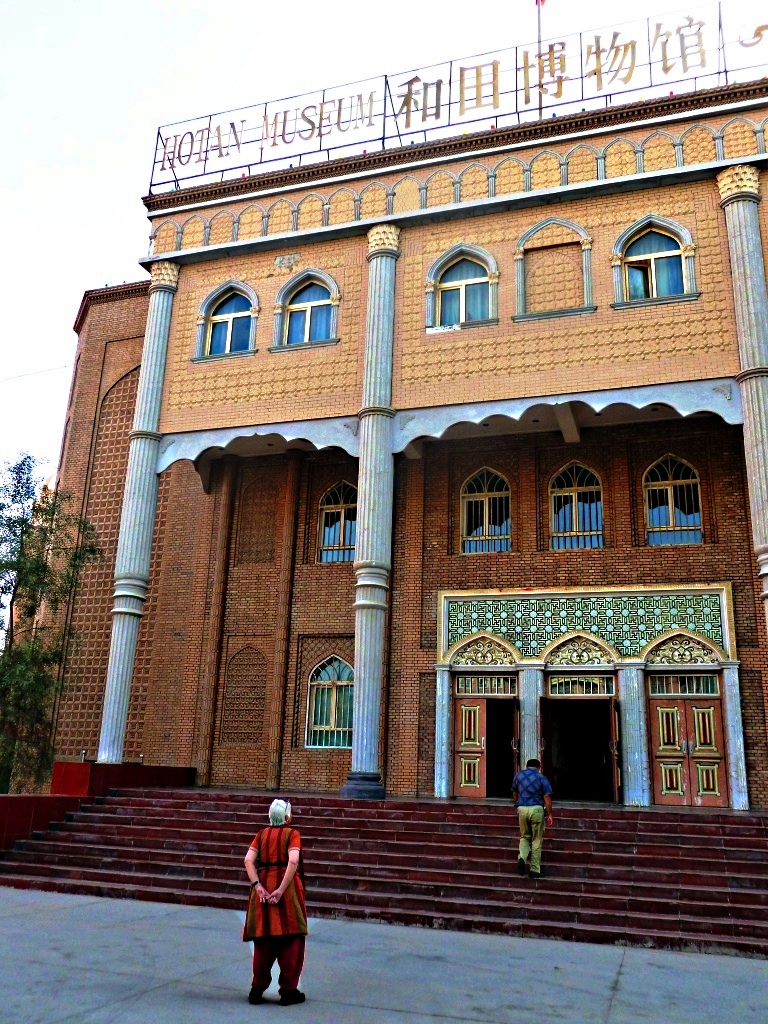
- Established: 1995
- Location: Hotan, Xinjiang, China
- Coordinates: 37.1125°N 79.9067°E
- Type: Museum

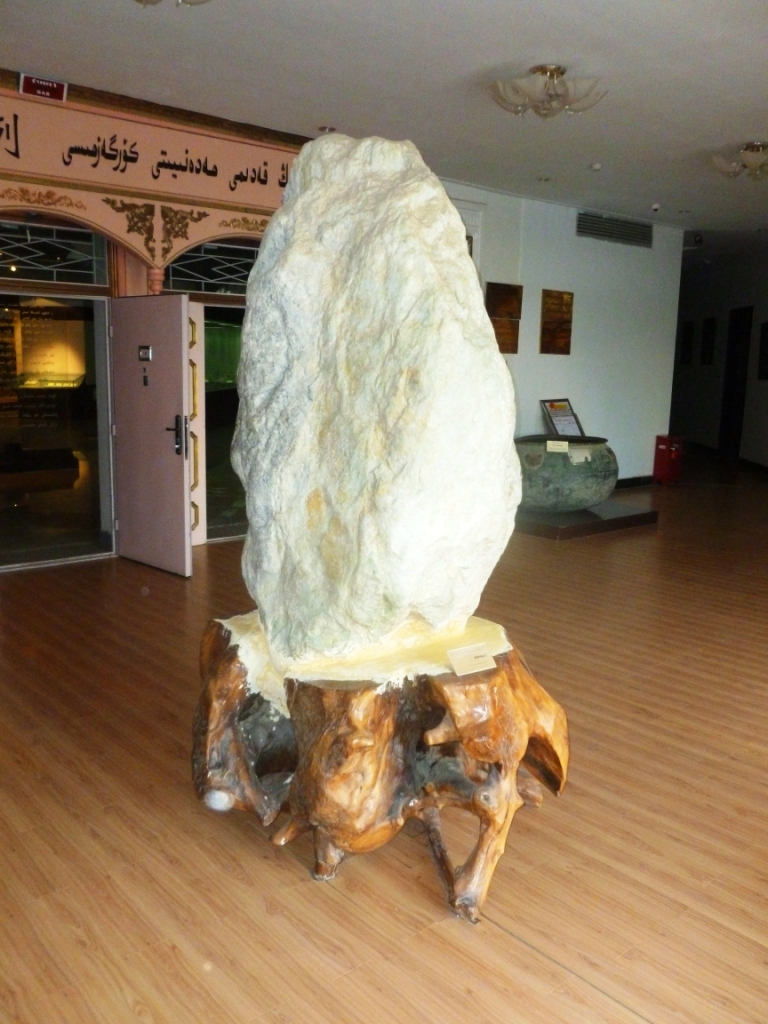
Local "mutton fat" nephrite jade displayed in Hotan Cultural Museum lobby.

Hotan Cultural Museum or Hetian Cultural Museum (Chinese: 和田地區博物館) is a museum in Hotan, Xinjiang, China. Founded in 1995, it has a range of silk fragments, wooden utensils and jewelry, and mummified corpses of a 10-year-old girl and a 35-year-old man with Eurasian faces, believed to be over 1,500 years old.

== See also ==
- List of museums in China
- Melikawat
