= Jiya Township =

Jiya: جىيا يېزىسى (Uyghur); 吉亚乡 (Chinese)
- Township
- Location in Xinjiang
- Coordinates: 37°09′44″N 79°59′46″E
- Country: China
- Autonomous Region: Xinjiang
- Prefecture: Hotan
- County-level city: Hotan
- Township established: 1984
- Villages: 22

Government
  - Township head (乡长): Batu'er Abudula (巴图尔·阿不都拉)

Area
  - Total: 171.8 km^{2} (66.3 sq mi)

Population (2016)
  - Total: 28,470
  - Density: 165.7/km^{2} (429.2/sq mi)
- Time zone: UTC+8 (China Standard)

Jiya (Uyghur: جىيا يېزىسى; ULY: Jiya Yëzisi; USY: Җия Йезиси; simplified Chinese: 吉亚乡; traditional Chinese: 吉亞鄉; pinyin: Jíyà Xiāng) is a township in the northeastern part of Hotan City in Hotan Prefecture, Xinjiang, China in an oasis area on the eastern bank of the White Jade River in the southwestern part of the Taklamakan Desert. To the north and east, Jiya borders Lop County, the county which Jiya was a part of until 2006, and to the south and west, Jiya borders the rest of Hotan city.

== Name ==
According to the traditions of local residents, 'Jiya' means "land washed out by river water" ("被河水冲刷或的土地"); the land in the original path of rivers is fertile.

== History ==
In 1984, Jiya was established as a township.

On July 11, 2006, Jiya and Yurungqash (Yulongkashi), originally part of Lop County, as well as and Tusalla (Tushala), originally part of Hotan County, were transferred to Hotan City.

In 2014, Tuanjiexin (Tuanjie Xincun; 团结新村) was made a village in Jiya. In 2014–5, the name for the village of Maidirisiboyi (买迪日斯博依村) was changed to Aidelaisi (艾德莱斯村).

In 2015–6, Jinye (金叶村) and Yuye (玉叶村) were made villages in Jiya.

In 2019, 288,000 yuan was spent to help twenty-eight adjacent poor families with grape growing in Jiya's Suyalangan (Suya Langancun) village.

== Administrative divisions ==
As of 2018, Jiya included twenty-two villages:

Villages (Mandarin Chinese Hanyu Pinyin-derived names, except where Uyghur is provided):

- Tawu'azi (塔吾阿孜村)
- Suyayujimaileke (Suya Yujimai Lekecun; 苏亚玉吉买勒克村)
- Outunqiyaole (欧吞其尧勒村)
- Kuoqia (阔恰村)
- Suyalangan (Suya Langancun; 苏亚兰干村)
- Bashilangan (巴什兰干村)
- Kumubage (Kumu Bagecun; 库木巴格村)
- Ailimatamu (Ailima Tamucun; 艾里玛塔木村)
- Jilega'airike (Jilega Airikecun; 吉勒尕艾日克村)
- Kutazimaili (库塔孜买里村 (Kuotazi Mailicun; 阔塔孜买里村))
- Akemaili (Akemailicun; 阿克买里村)
- Xiakemaili (Xiake Mailicun; 夏克买里村)
- Azinaibazha (Azinai Bazhacun; 阿孜乃巴扎村)
- Tierekelike (Tiereke Likecun; 铁热克力克村)
- Ke'erpamaili (克尔帕买里村)
- Aidelaisi (艾德莱斯村)
- Kaltetügmen / Kaletatugeman (Kaleta Tugemancun; كالتەتۈگمەن كەنت / 喀勒塔吐格曼村)
- Yatugeman (Yatu Gemancun; 亚吐格曼村)
- Bashitugeman (Bashi Tugemancun; 巴什吐格曼村)
- Tuanjiexin (团结新村)
- Jinye (金叶村)
- Yuye (玉叶村)

In 2009, villages in the township included (Mandarin Chinese Hanyu Pinyin-derived names):

- Tawu'azi (塔吾阿孜村), Suyayujimaileke (苏亚玉吉买勒克村), Outunqiyaole (欧吞其尧勒村), Kuoqia (阔恰村), Suyalangan (苏亚兰干村), Bashilangan (巴什兰干村), Kumubage (库木巴格村), Ailimatamu (艾里玛塔木村), Jilega'airike (吉勒尕艾日克村), Kutazimaili (库塔孜买里村), Akemaili (阿克买里村), Xiakemaili (夏克买里村), Azinaibazha (阿孜乃巴扎村), Tierekelike (铁热克力克村), Ke'erpamaili (克尔帕买里村), Maidirisiboyi (买迪日斯博依村), Kaletatugeman (喀勒塔吐格曼村), Yatugeman (亚吐格曼村), Bashitugeman (巴什吐格曼村)

== Economy ==
Jiya Township is considered the hometown of Atlas silk, which is produced in the township. Hotan Carpets are produced in the township.

== Demographics ==
Historical population
Year	Pop.	±% p.a.
2000	17,946	—
2010	22,071	+2.09%

In 1997, Uyghurs made up the vast majority of the population of Jiya Township.

In 2006, the total population of Jiya Township was 19,603, with 18,688 persons in farming families. Out of the total population, 19,558 were Uyghurs (99.8%).

In 2016, out of a total population of 28,470 persons in the township, 99.77% were Uyghurs.

== Transportation ==
- China National Highway 217

== See also ==
- List of township-level divisions of Xinjiang
