= Hotan =

Hotan: خوتەن شەھىرى (Uyghur); 和田市 (Chinese); Khotan, Hetian
- County-level city
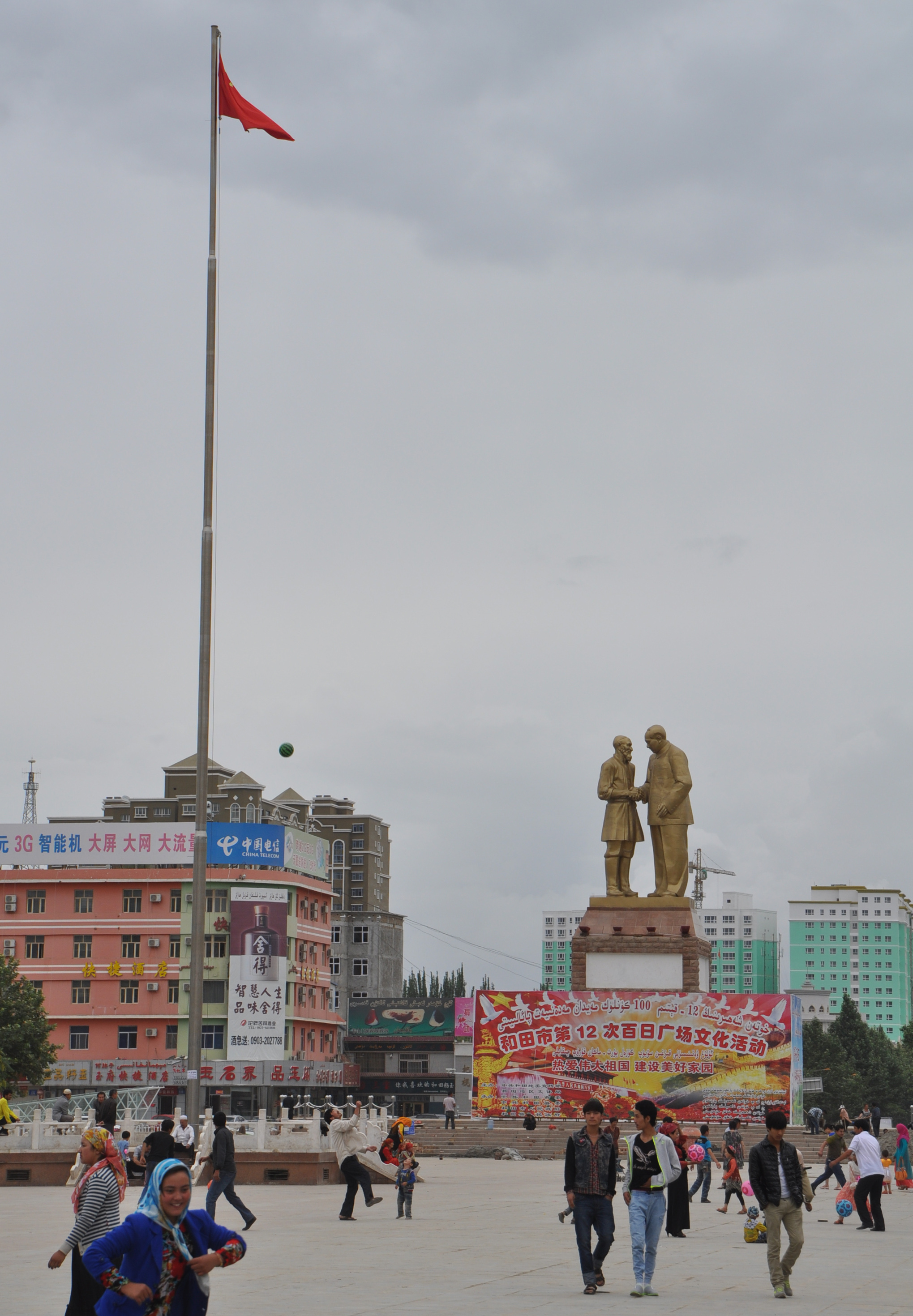
- Tuanjie Square

- Location in Xinjiang Hotan (China) Hotan (Continental Asia)
- Coordinates: 37°07′N 79°55′E
- Country: China
- Autonomous region: Xinjiang
- Prefecture: Hotan
- Municipal seat: Nurbagh Subdistrict

Area
  - Total: 465.84 km^{2} (179.86 sq mi)
- Elevation: 1,382 m (4,534 ft)

Population (2020)
  - Total: 501,028
  - Density: 1,075.5/km^{2} (2,785.6/sq mi)
- Demonym(s): Hotanese, Khotanese

Demographics
  - Ethnic groups: 90.3% Uyghur; 9.4% Han Chinese; <0.3% other
  - Spoken languages: Uyghur, Mandarin Chinese
- Time zone: UTC+8 (China Standard (Note: Locals in Xinjiang frequently observe UTC+6 (Xinjiang Time), 2 hours behind Beijing.))
- Postal code: 839000
- Area code: 0903
- GDP (Nominal): 2018
  - Total: ¥8.274 billion $1.247 billion
  - Per Capita: ¥20,399 $3,076
  - Growth: ▲7.1%
- License plate prefix: 新R
- Website: Hotan Government Website (in Chinese)

Hotan

Uyghur name
- Uyghur: خوتەن
Transcriptions
- Latin Yëziqi: Xoten
- Yengi Yeziⱪ: Hotən
- SASM/GNC: Hotan
- Siril Yëziqi: Хотән
- Uyghur IPA: [χotʰǽn]

Chinese name
- Chinese: 和田
Transcriptions
Standard Mandarin
- Hanyu Pinyin: Hétián
- Bopomofo: ㄏㄜˊ ㄊㄧㄢˊ
- Gwoyeu Romatzyh: Hertyan
- Wade–Giles: Ho²-tʻien²
- IPA: [xɤ̌.tʰjɛ̌n]

Alternative Chinese name
- Simplified Chinese: 和阗
- Traditional Chinese: 和闐
Transcriptions
Standard Mandarin
- Hanyu Pinyin: Hétián
- Bopomofo: ㄏㄜˊ ㄊㄧㄢˊ
- Gwoyeu Romatzyh: Hertyan
- Wade–Giles: Ho²-tʻien²
- IPA: [xɤ̌.tʰjɛ̌n]

Second alternative Chinese name
- Simplified Chinese: 于窴
- Traditional Chinese: 于窴
Transcriptions
Standard Mandarin
- Hanyu Pinyin: Yútián
- Bopomofo: ㄩˊ ㄊㄧㄢˊ
- Gwoyeu Romatzyh: Yutyan
- Wade–Giles: Yü²-tʻien²
- IPA: [y̌.tʰjɛ̌n]

Kazakh name
- Kazakh: حوتان قالاسى; Хотан қаласы Hotan qalasy [(q)χotʰán q(χ)ɑlasɯ́]

Kyrgyz name
- Kyrgyz: حوتەن شاارى; Хотан шаары Hotan şaary [(q)χotʰán ʂɑːɾɯ́]

Hotan (Note: Uyghur: خوتەن, romanized: Xoten; Chinese: 和田; pinyin: Hétián) is a major oasis town in southwestern Xinjiang, an autonomous region in Northwestern China. The city proper of Hotan broke off from the larger Hotan County to become an administrative area in its own right in August 1984. It is the seat of Hotan Prefecture.

With a population of 408,900 (2018 census), Hotan is situated in the Tarim Basin some 1,500 kilometres (930 mi) southwest of the regional capital, Ürümqi. It lies just north of the Kunlun Mountains, which are crossed by the Sanju, Hindutash and Ilchi passes. The town, located southeast of Yarkant County and populated almost exclusively by Uyghurs, is a minor agricultural center. An important station on the southern branch of the historic Silk Road, Hotan has always depended on two strong rivers, the Karakash River and the White Jade River, to provide the water needed to survive on the southwestern edge of the vast Taklamakan Desert. The White Jade River still provides water and irrigation for the town and oasis.

== Etymology ==
Hotan and its surrounding area were originally known as Godana in ancient Sanskrit cosmological texts. The Chinese transcribed the name as 于窴, pronounced Gudana in Middle Chinese (Yutian in modern Standard Chinese); the pronunciation eventually morphed into Khotan. In the 7th century, the Chinese Buddhist monk and scholar Xuanzang attempted to remedy this lexical change. Xuanzang, who was well-versed in Sanskrit, proposed that the traditional name was in fact Kustana (गौस्तन) and asserted it meant "breast of the earth". However, this was likely borrowed from the Tibetan name for the region, Gosthana, which means "land of cows", itself Sanskritic in origin, which is most likely the original name of Hotan, and a consequence of ancient Indian settlement in the region.

An alternative origin was proposed by Harold Walter Bailey, an expert in the Khotanese language, who believed the oldest indigenous name to be Hvatana, but thought its original meaning to be uncertain.

Hotan was known to 19th-century European explorers as Ilchi.

The official Uyghur-to-Latin transliteration, and therefore English spelling, of the modern city's name is "Hotan" according to the Register of Chinese Geographic Places. The Hanyu pinyin romanization Hetian has been used on some maps and by some airports. The city's former Chinese name was written with a different character for tian (simplified Chinese: 阗; traditional Chinese: 闐; pinyin: tián).

== History ==
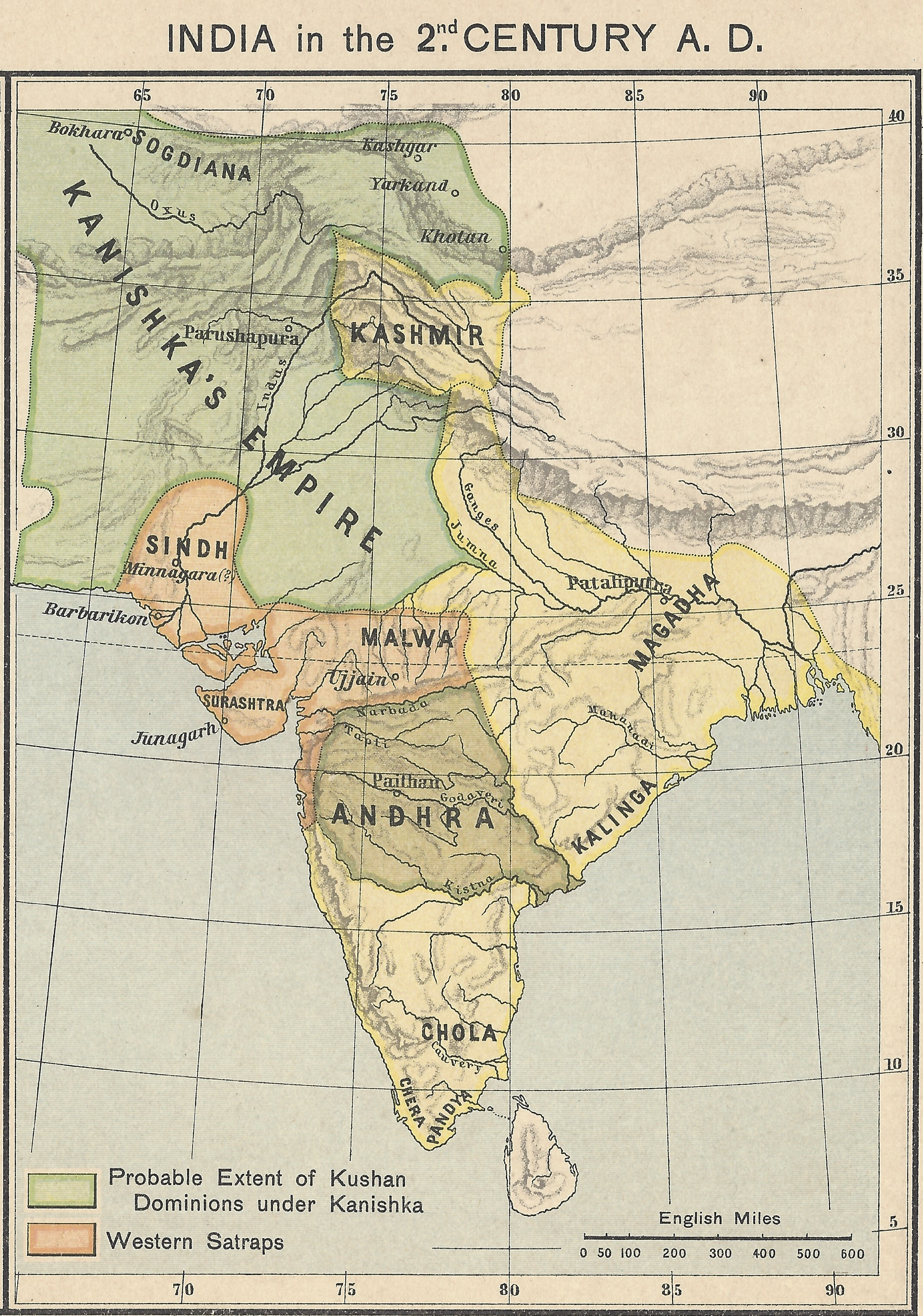
Kanishka's Empire (2nd century AD) including Khotan

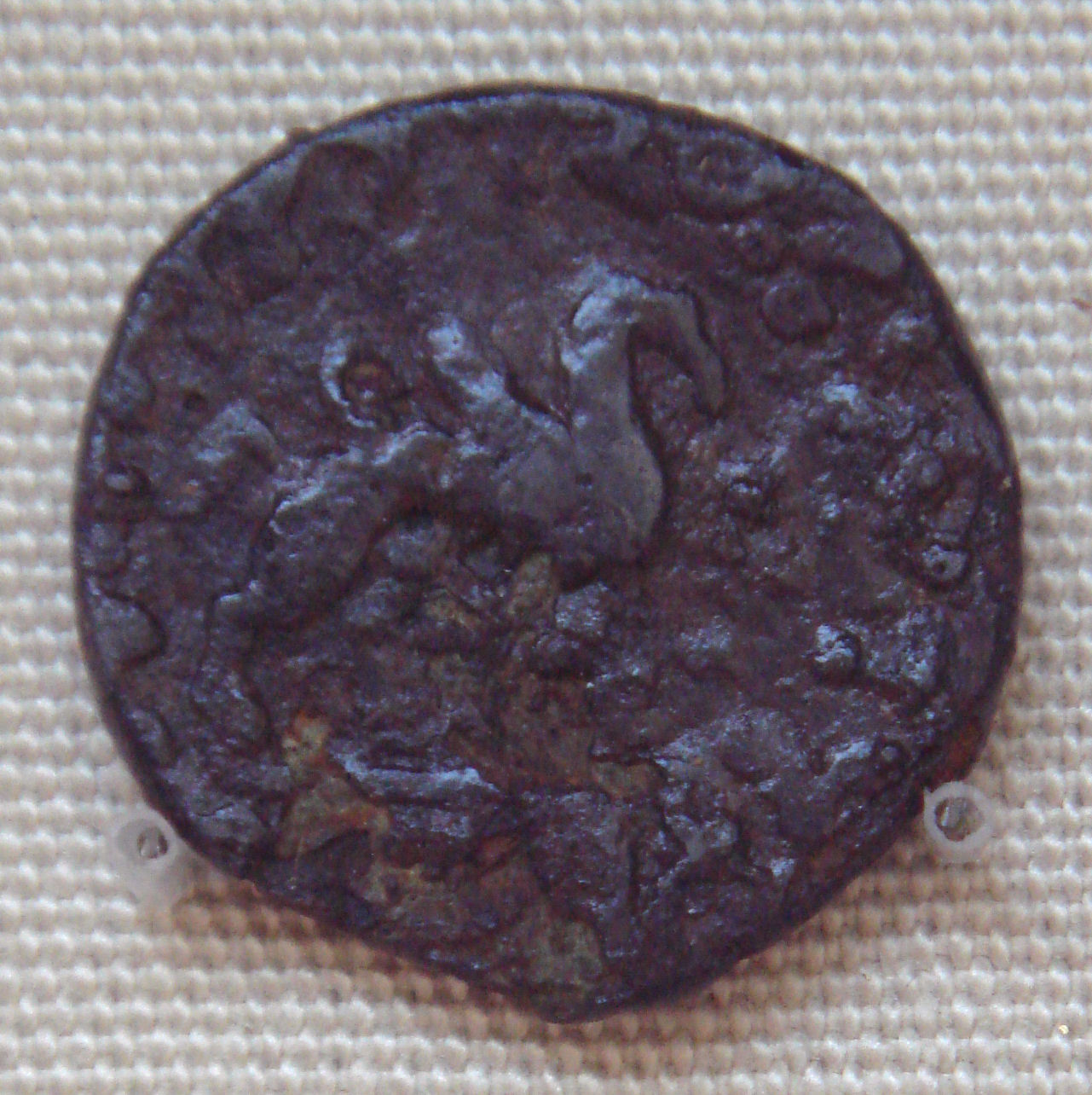
Bronze coin of Kujula Kadphises found in Khotan.

The oasis of Hotan is strategically located at the junction of the southern (and most ancient) branch of the Silk Road joining China and the West with one of the main routes from ancient India and Tibet to Central Asia and distant China. It provided a convenient meeting place where not only goods, but technologies, philosophies, and religions were transmitted from one culture to another.

Tocharians lived in this region over 2000 years ago. Several of the Tarim mummies were found in the region. At Sampul, east of the city of Hotan, there is an extensive series of cemeteries scattered over an area about 1 kilometre (0.62 mi) wide and 23 km (14 mi) long. The excavated sites range from about 300 BCE to 100 CE. The excavated graves have produced a number of fabrics of felt, wool, silk and cotton and even a fine bit of tapestry, the Sampul tapestry, showing the face of a Caucasoid man which was made of threads of 24 shades of color. The tapestry had been cut up and fashioned into trousers worn by one of the deceased. An Anthropological study of 56 individuals showed a primarily Caucasoid population. A study in 2010 showed that an Eastern Eurasian lineage common in Siberia dominates the mitochondrial DNA of the mummies from the Xiaohe Cemetery. Their Y chromosome is distributed throughout Eastern Europe, South Asia, Central Asia, and Siberia.

There is a relative abundance of information on Hotan readily available for study. The main historical sources are to be found in the Chinese histories (particularly detailed during the Han and early Tang dynasties) when China was interested in control of the Western Regions, the accounts of several Chinese pilgrim monks, a few Buddhist histories of Hotan that have survived in Classical Tibetan and a large number of documents in the Iranian Saka language and other languages discovered, for the most part, early this century at various sites in the Tarim Basin and from the hidden library at the Mogao Caves near Dunhuang.Additionally, Khotanese materials from the Dunhuang library cave provide insight into the region's interactions with its neighbors, particularly Dunhuang and the Tang dynasty. However, Cave 17 at Dunhuang does not record the fall of Khotan—overnight, it ceased being a Buddhist stronghold and became predominantly Islamic, marking a dramatic and largely undocumented shift in its religious landscape.

=== Indo-Greek Khotan ===
In the Hellenistic period, there was an Indo-Greek colony in Khotan. Hellenism in this region, as also in some parts of India, left a lasting mark with Greco-Buddhist art. Govett Ernest wrote an article on a Chinese Greco-Buddhist bronze head, giving an example of this lasting impact.

=== Buddhist Khotan ===
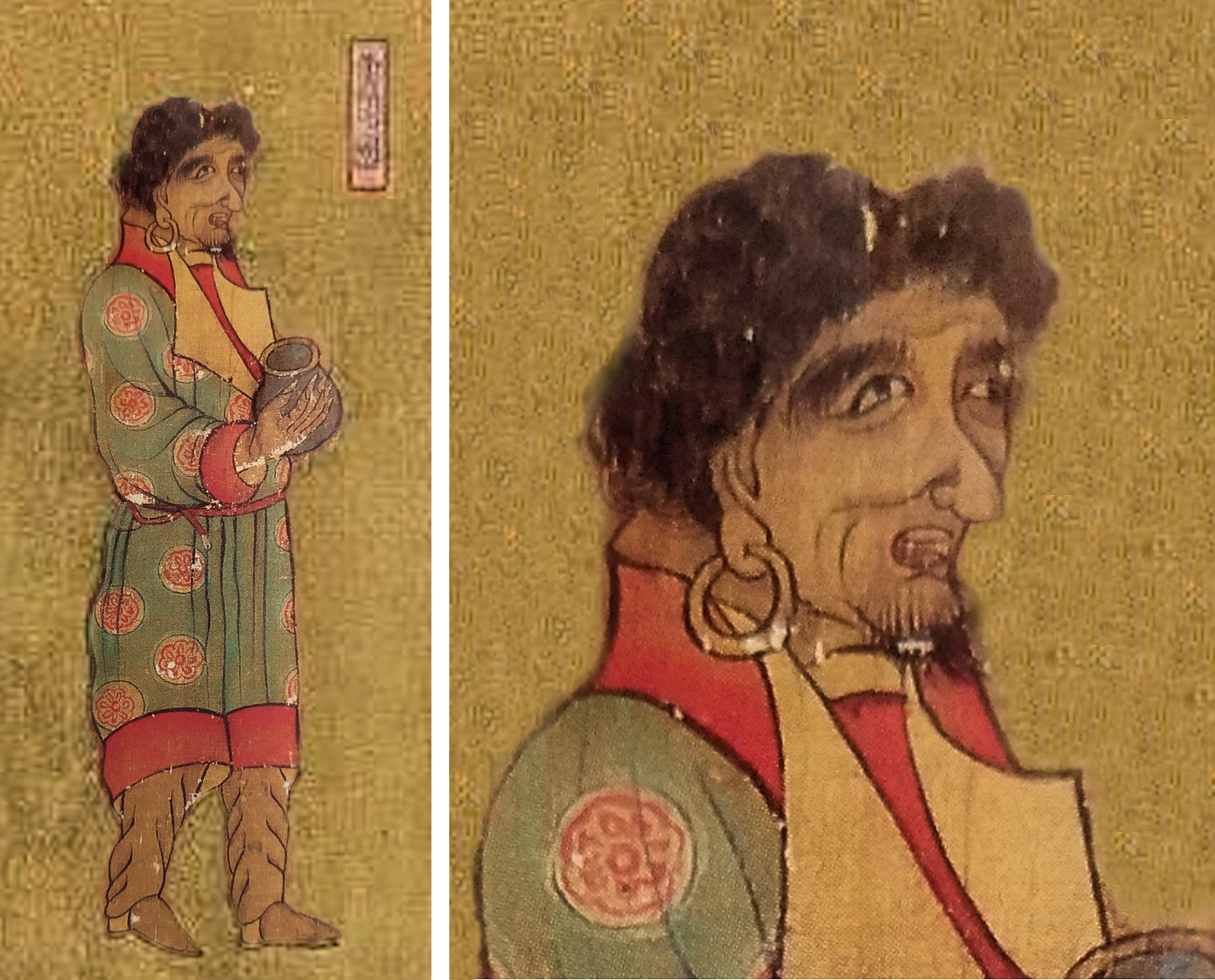
Ambassador from Khotan (于闐國 Yutian) to the Tang dynasty, in Wanghuitu (王會圖) circa 650 CE.

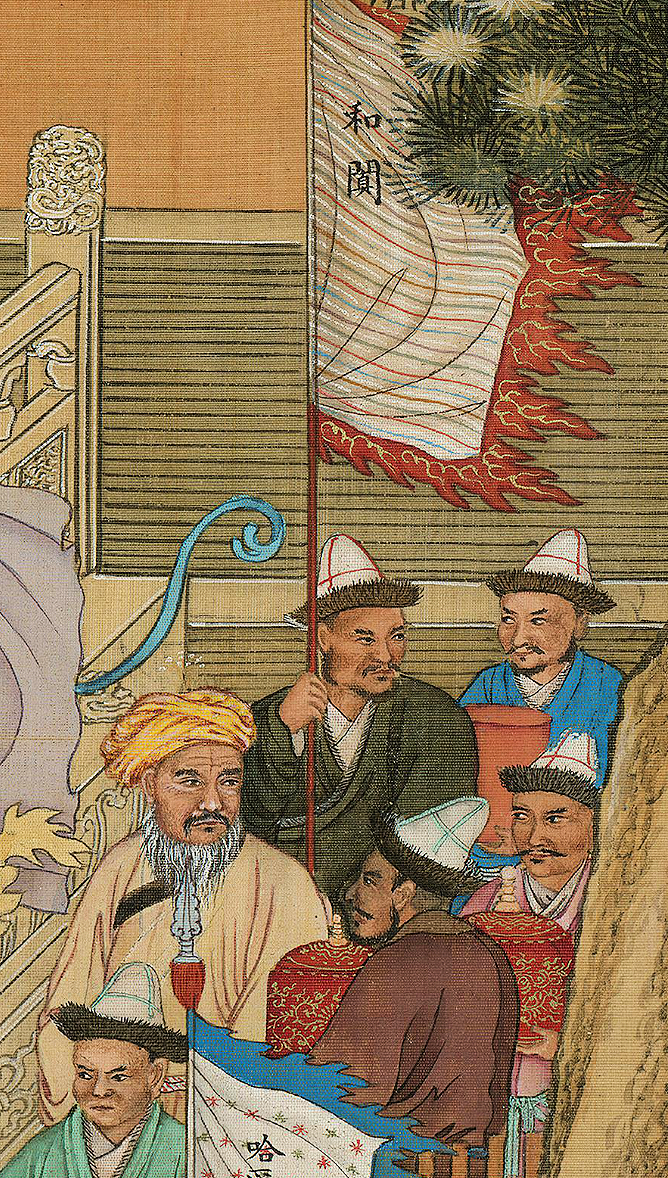
Khotan (和阗) delegates in Beijing, China, in 1761. 万国来朝图

The ancient Kingdom of Khotan was one of the earliest Buddhist states in the world and a cultural bridge across which Buddhist culture and learning were transmitted from India to China. Its capital was located to the west of the modern city of Hotan. The inhabitants of the Kingdom of Khotan, like those of early Kashgar and Yarkant, spoke Saka, one of the Eastern Iranian languages. Khotan's indigenous dynasty (all of whose royal names are Indian in origin) governed a fervently Buddhist city-state boasting some 400 temples in the late 9th/early 10th century—four times the number recorded by Xuanzang around 630. The kingdom was independent but was intermittently under Chinese control during the Han and Tang dynasties.

After the Tang dynasty, Khotan allied with the rulers of Dunhuang. Khotan enjoyed close relations with the Buddhist centre at Dunhuang: the Khotanese royal family intermarried with Dunhuang élites, visited and patronized Dunhuang's Buddhist temple complex, and donated money to have their portraits painted on the walls of the Mogao grottos. Through the 10th century, Khotanese royal portraits were painted in association with an increasing number of deities in the caves. Besides this, a particular site, Melikawat functioned as a major Buddhist center in the Kingdom of Khotan.

In the 10th century, Khotan began a struggle with the Kara-Khanid Khanate, a Turkic state. The Kara-Khanid ruler, Sultan Satuq Bughra Khan, had converted to Islam:

Satuq's son, Musa, began to put pressure on Khotan in the mid-10th century, and sometime before 1006 Yusuf Qadir Khan of Kashgar besieged and took the city. This conquest of Buddhist Khotan by the Muslim Turks—about which there are many colourful legends—marked another watershed in the Islamicisation and Turkicisation of the Tarim Basin, and an end to local autonomy of this southern Tarim city state.

Some Khotanese Buddhist works were unearthed.

The rulers of Khotan were aware of the menace they faced since they arranged for the Mogao grottoes to paint a growing number of divine figures along with themselves. Halfway in the 10th century Khotan came under attack by the Qarakhanid ruler Musa, and in what proved to be a pivotal moment in the Turkification and Islamification of the Tarim Basin, the Karakhanid leader Yusuf Qadir Khan conquered Khotan around 1006.

=== Islamic Khotan ===
Yūsuf Qadr Khān was a brother or cousin of the Muslim ruler of Kashgar and Balasagun, Khotan lost its independence and between 1006 and 1165, became part of the Kara-Khanid Khanate. Later it fell to the Kara-Khitan Khanate, after which it was ruled by the Mongols.

When Marco Polo visited Khotan in the 13th century, he noted that the people were all Muslim. He wrote that:

Khotan was "a province eight days’ journey in extent, which is subject to the Great Khan. The inhabitants all worship Mahomet. It has cities and towns in plenty, of which the most splendid, and the capital of the province, bears the same name as that of the province…It is amply stocked with the means of life. Cotton grows here in plenty. It has vineyards, estates and orchards in plenty. The people live by trade and industry; they are not at all warlike".

=== Qing period ===
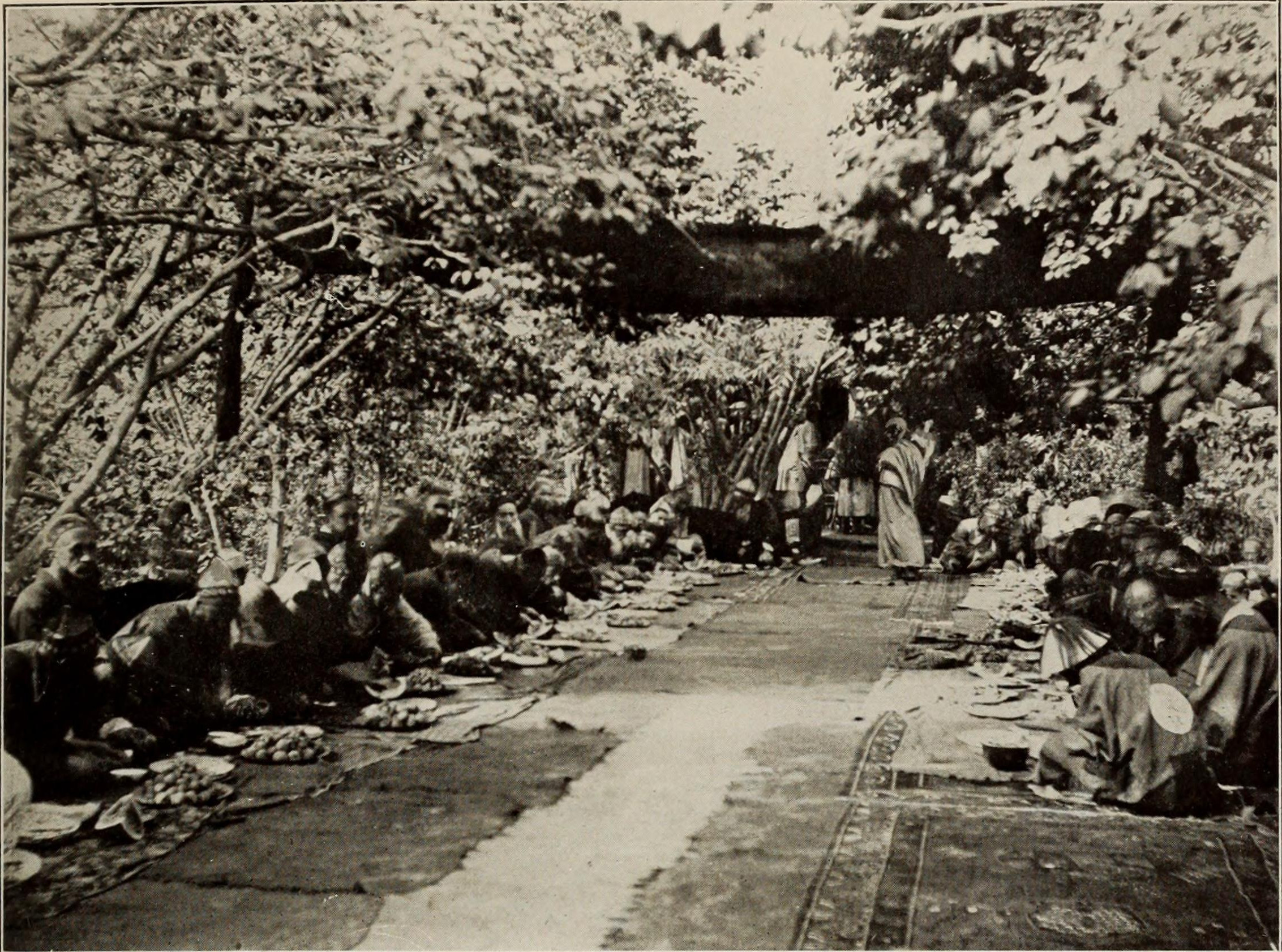
Amban Ch´ê Ta-jên's guests feasting on a terrace in Nar-Bagh, 1912

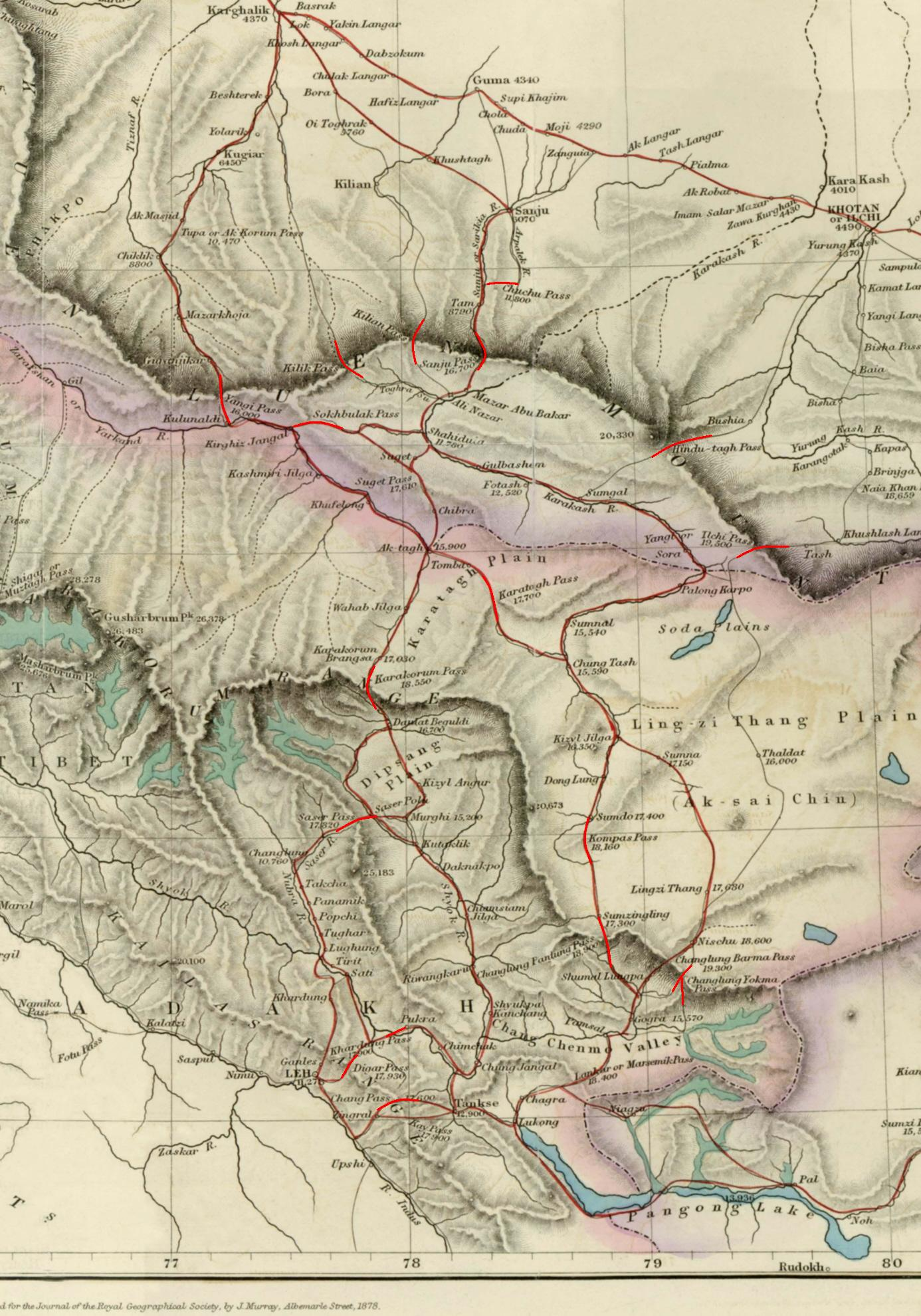
Map of Central Asia (1878) showing Khotan (near top right corner) and the Sanju Pass, Hindutash, and Ilchi passes through the Kunlun Mountains to Leh, Ladakh. The border claimed by British Raj is shown in the two-toned purple and pink band.

The Qing dynasty of China conquered the Dzungar Khanate during the final stage of the Dzungar–Qing Wars in the late 1750s. By 1760, Hotan became the territory of the Qing dynasty along with the rest of Xinjiang. The town suffered severely during the Dungan Revolt (1862–1877) against the Qing rule and again a few years later when Yaqub Beg of Kashgar made himself master of Kashgaria, ruling the newly founded Turkic state known at the time as Yettishar. However, Xinjiang was reconquered by the Qing dynasty by 1877 and was converted into a province in 1884.

=== Post-Qing ===
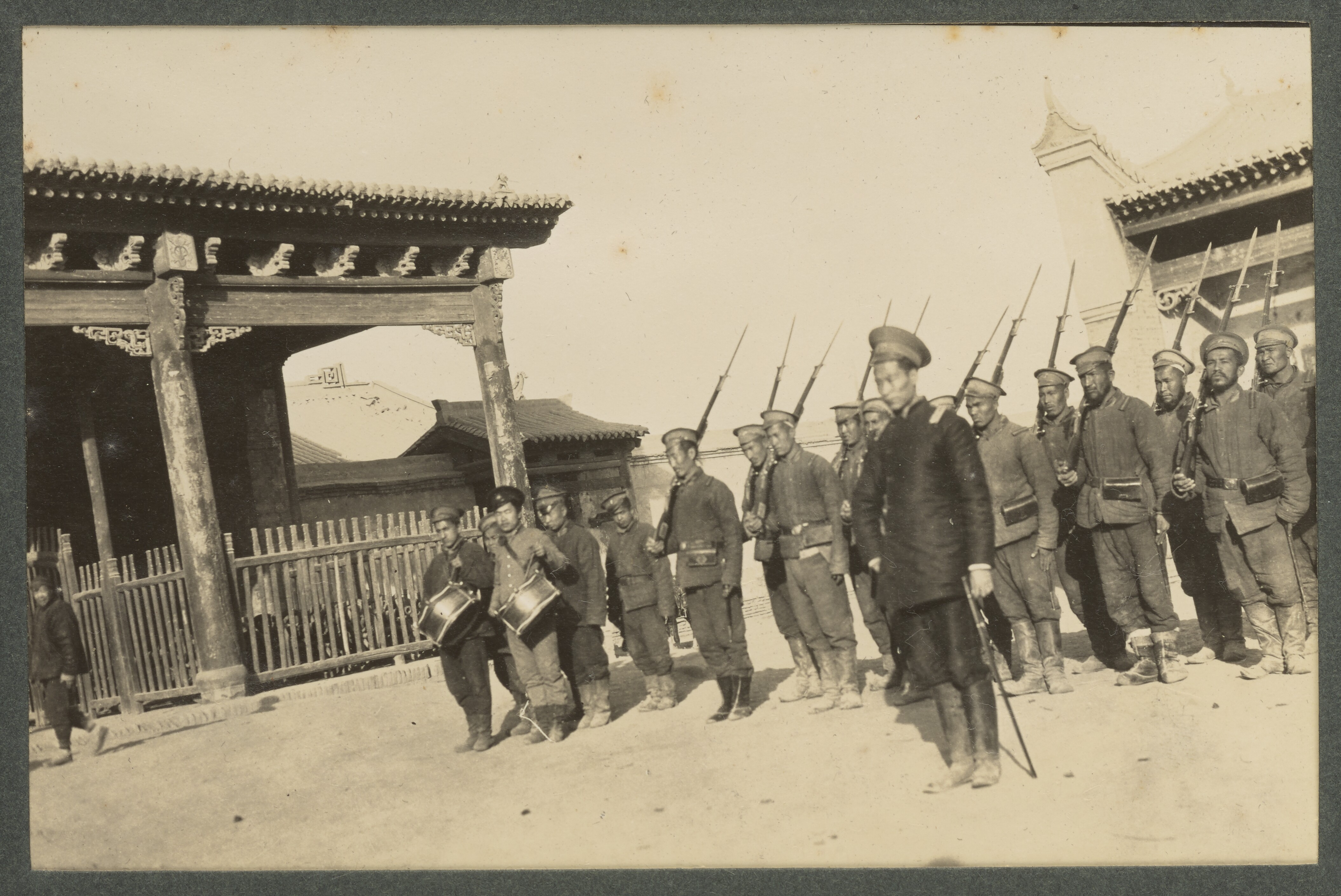
Chinese troops at Khotan, 1915

Qing imperial authority collapsed in 1912. During the Republican era in China, warlords and local ethnic self-determination movements wrestled over control of Xinjiang. Abdullah Bughra, Nur Ahmad Jan Bughra, and Muhammad Amin Bughra declared themselves Emirs of Khotan during the Kumul Rebellion. Tunganistan was an independent administered region in the southern part of Xinjiang from 1934 to 1937. The territory included the oases of the southern Tarim Basin; the centre of the region was Khotan. Beginning with the Islamic rebellion in 1937, Hotan and the rest of the province came under the control of warlord Sheng Shicai. Sheng was later ousted by the Kuomintang.

=== People's Republic of China ===
Shortly after the Communists won the civil war in 1949, Hotan was incorporated into the People's Republic of China.

In 1983/4, the urban area of Hotan was administratively split from the larger Hotan County, and from then on governed as a county-level city.

On July 11, 2006, the townships of Jiya and Yurungqash (Yulongkashi) in Lop County and Tusalla (Tushala) in Hotan County were transferred to Hotan City.

Following the July 2009 Ürümqi riots, ethnic tensions rose in Xinjiang and in Hotan in particular. As a result, the city has seen occasional bouts of violence. In June 2011, Hotan opened its first passenger-train service to Kashgar, which was established as a special economic zone following the riots. In July of the same year, a bomb and knife attack occurred on the city's central thoroughfare. In June 2011, authorities in Hotan Prefecture sentenced Uyghur Muslim Hebibullah Ibrahim to ten years imprisonment for selling "illegal religious materials". In June 2012, Tianjin Airlines Flight 7554 was hijacked en route from Hotan to Ürümqi.

In a report from the Uyghur American Association, in June 2012, notice was said to be given that police planned to undertake a search of every residence in Gujanbagh (Gujiangbage), Hotan. Hotan is the last municipality in Xinjiang with a majority Ugyhur presence in the core of the city. The UAA viewed this as an attempt to systematically intimidate the Uyghur population in Hotan.

The Sultanim Cemetery (37°07′02″N 79°56′04″E) in central Hotan was a historical Uyghur graveyard that also included a religious shrine. According to a 2019 interview by the Uyghur Human Rights Project, the cemetery entombed four commanders of Sultan Satuq Bughra Khan, who conquered the city around 960 CE and spread Islam. Due to space limitations after over a thousand years of burials, multiple bodies had to reuse the same grave, and additionals layers were dug underneath old ones. Between 2018 and 2019, the cemetery was demolished and the western part of the land turned into a parking lot.

== Geography and climate ==
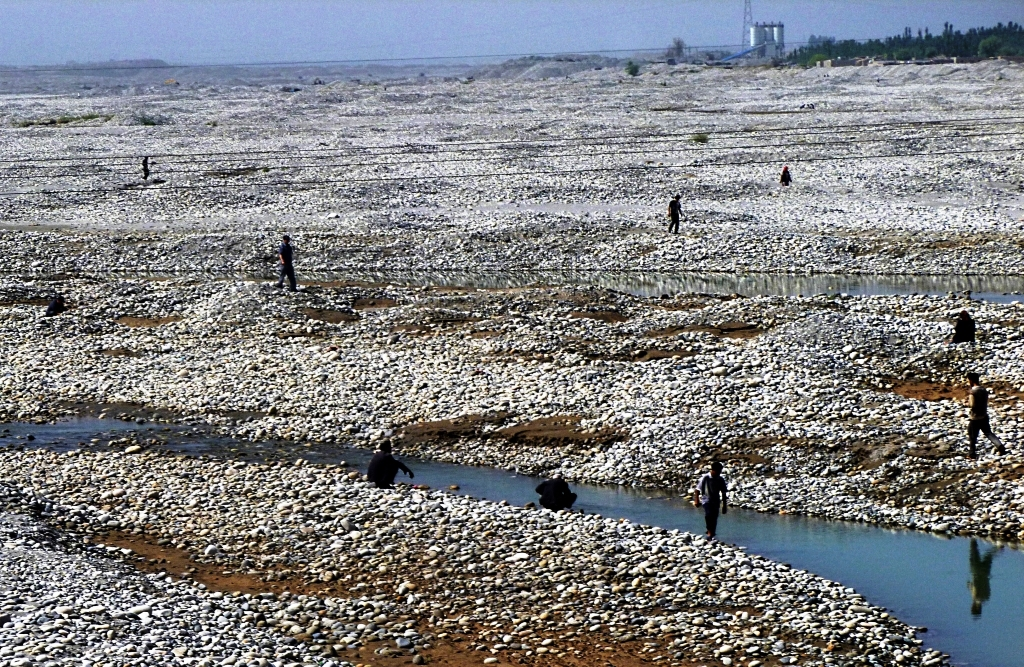
Collecting jade in the White Jade River near Hotan in 2011

Hotan has a temperate zone, cold desert climate (Köppen BWk), with a mean annual total of only 36.5 millimetres (1.44 in) of precipitation falling on 17.3 days of the year. Due to its southerly location in Xinjiang just north of the Kunlun Mountains, during winter it is one of the warmest locations in the region, with average high temperatures remaining above freezing throughout the year. The monthly 24-hour average temperature ranges from −3.9 °C (25.0 °F) in January to 25.8 °C (78.4 °F) in July, and the annual mean is 13.03 °C (55.5 °F). The diurnal temperature variation is not large for a desert, averaging 11.8 °C (21.2 °F) annually. Although no month averages less than half of possible sunshine, the city only receives 2,587 hours of bright sunshine annually, which is on the low end for Xinjiang; monthly percent possible sunshine ranges from 50% in March to 75% in October.

Climate data for Hotan, elevation 1,375 m (4,511 ft), (1991–2020 normals, extremes 1951–present)
Month	Jan	Feb	Mar	Apr	May	Jun	Jul	Aug	Sep	Oct	Nov	Dec	Year
Record high °C (°F)	20.5 (68.9)	22.5 (72.5)	31.4 (88.5)	35.4 (95.7)	37.6 (99.7)	39.8 (103.6)	41.4 (106.5)	40.2 (104.4)	35.9 (96.6)	31.1 (88.0)	25.4 (77.7)	18.3 (64.9)	41.4 (106.5)
Mean daily maximum °C (°F)	1.2 (34.2)	7.3 (45.1)	16.7 (62.1)	24.1 (75.4)	28.1 (82.6)	31.2 (88.2)	32.9 (91.2)	31.6 (88.9)	27.6 (81.7)	21.0 (69.8)	12.1 (53.8)	3.4 (38.1)	19.8 (67.6)
Daily mean °C (°F)	−3.8 (25.2)	1.9 (35.4)	10.6 (51.1)	17.6 (63.7)	21.6 (70.9)	24.8 (76.6)	26.4 (79.5)	25.2 (77.4)	21.0 (69.8)	14.0 (57.2)	5.7 (42.3)	−1.7 (28.9)	13.6 (56.5)
Mean daily minimum °C (°F)	−7.9 (17.8)	−2.8 (27.0)	5.1 (41.2)	11.8 (53.2)	15.8 (60.4)	19.3 (66.7)	21.0 (69.8)	20.0 (68.0)	15.5 (59.9)	8.0 (46.4)	0.8 (33.4)	−5.7 (21.7)	8.4 (47.1)
Record low °C (°F)	−21.0 (−5.8)	−19.3 (−2.7)	−7.0 (19.4)	−0.2 (31.6)	4.3 (39.7)	9.5 (49.1)	12.2 (54.0)	10.2 (50.4)	4.3 (39.7)	−2.1 (28.2)	−12.3 (9.9)	−19.3 (−2.7)	−21.0 (−5.8)
Average precipitation mm (inches)	1.9 (0.07)	2.1 (0.08)	3.1 (0.12)	3.4 (0.13)	7.3 (0.29)	10.4 (0.41)	6.1 (0.24)	6.0 (0.24)	4.5 (0.18)	1.2 (0.05)	1.1 (0.04)	1.5 (0.06)	48.6 (1.91)
Average precipitation days (≥ 0.1 mm)	2.6	1.4	0.9	1.4	2.4	3.7	3.2	2.2	1.2	0.3	0.5	1.8	21.6
Average snowy days	5.0	2.6	0.6	0	0	0	0	0	0	0	0.6	3.8	12.6
Average relative humidity (%)	53	42	29	27	33	36	40	42	41	37	41	53	40
Mean monthly sunshine hours	175.4	176.0	208.5	225.0	263.8	263.2	246.0	231.0	240.4	267.3	222.4	183.2	2,702.2
Percentage possible sunshine	57	57	55	57	60	60	56	56	66	79	74	62	62
Source: China Meteorological AdministrationNOAAall-time February high

According to the World Air Quality Report 2024, Hotan is one of the world's 20 most polluted cities.

== Administrative divisions ==
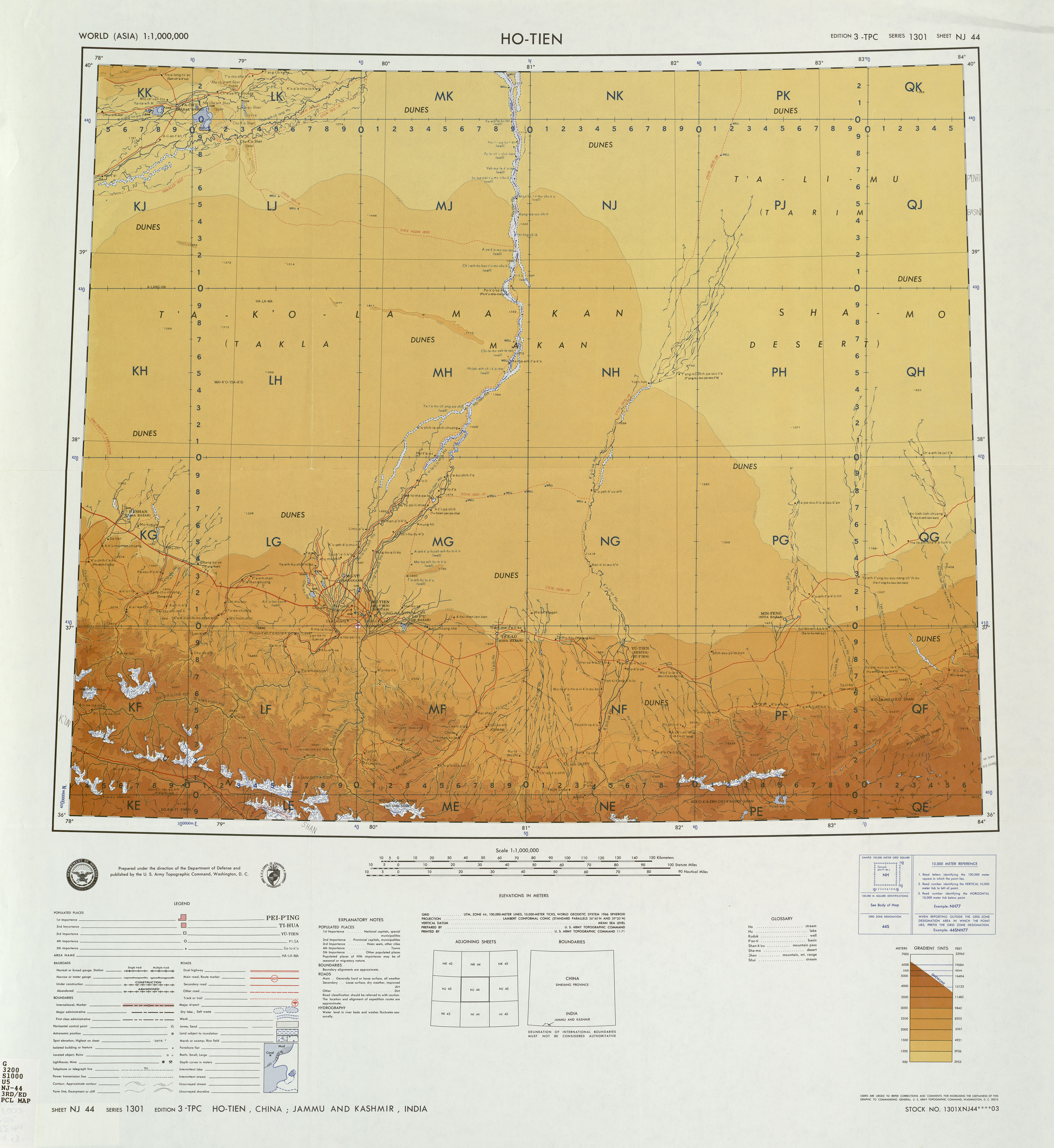
Map of Hotan (labeled as HO-TIEN (HO-T'IEN) (KHOTAN)) and surrounding region from the International Map of the World (USATC, 1971) (Note: From map: "DELINEATION OF INTERNATIONAL BOUNDARIES MUST NOT BE CONSIDERED AUTHORITATIVE".)

The city includes four subdistricts, three towns, five townships and two other areas:

Name	Simplified Chinese	Hanyu Pinyin	Uyghur (UEY)	Uyghur Latin (ULY)	Administrative division code	Notes
Subdistricts
Nurbagh Subdistrict (Nurbag)	努尔巴格街道 (奴尔巴格街道)	Nǔ'ěrbāgé Jiēdào	نۇرباغ كوچا باشقارمىسى	nurbagh kocha bashqarmisi	653201001	
Gujanbagh Subdistrict	古江巴格街道	Gǔjiāngbāgé Jiēdào	گۇجانباغ كوچا باشقارمىسى	gujanbagh kocha bashqarmisi	653201002	
Gulbagh Subdistrict	古勒巴格街道	Gǔlèbāgé Jiēdào	گۈلباغ كوچا باشقارمىسى	gülbagh kocha bashqarmisi	653201003	
Narbagh Subdistrict	纳尔巴格街道	Nà'ěrbāgé Jiēdào	نارباغ كوچا باشقارمىسى	narbagh kocha bashqarmisi	653201004	
Towns
Laskuy Town	拉斯奎镇	Lāsīkuí Zhèn	لاسكۇي بازىرى	laskuy baziri	653201100	
Yurungqash Town	玉龙喀什镇	Yùlóngkāshí Zhèn	يۇرۇڭقاش بازىرى	yurungqash baziri	653201101	
Tusalla Town	吐沙拉镇	Tǔshālā Zhèn	تۇساللا بازىرى	tusalla baziri	653201102	formerly Tusalla Township (تۇساللا يېزىسى, 吐沙拉乡)
Townships
Shorbagh Township	肖尔巴格乡	Xiào'ěrbāgé Xiāng	شورباغ يېزىسى	shorbagh yëzisi	653201200	
Ilchi Township	伊里其乡	Yīlǐqí Xiāng	ئىلچى يېزىسى	Ilchi yëzisi	653201201	
Gujanbagh Township	古江巴格乡	Gǔjiāngbāgé Xiāng	گۇجانباغ يېزىسى	gujanbagh yëzisi	653201202	
Jiya Township	吉亚乡	Jíyà Xiāng	جىيا يېزىسى	jiya yëzisi	653201204	
Aqchal Township	阿克恰勒乡	Ākèqiàlè Xiāng	ئاقچال يېزىسى	Aqchal yëzisi	653201205	

Others:

- Beijing Industrial Park (北京工业园区), Hotan City Jinghe Logistics Park (和田市京和物流园区)

== Demographics ==
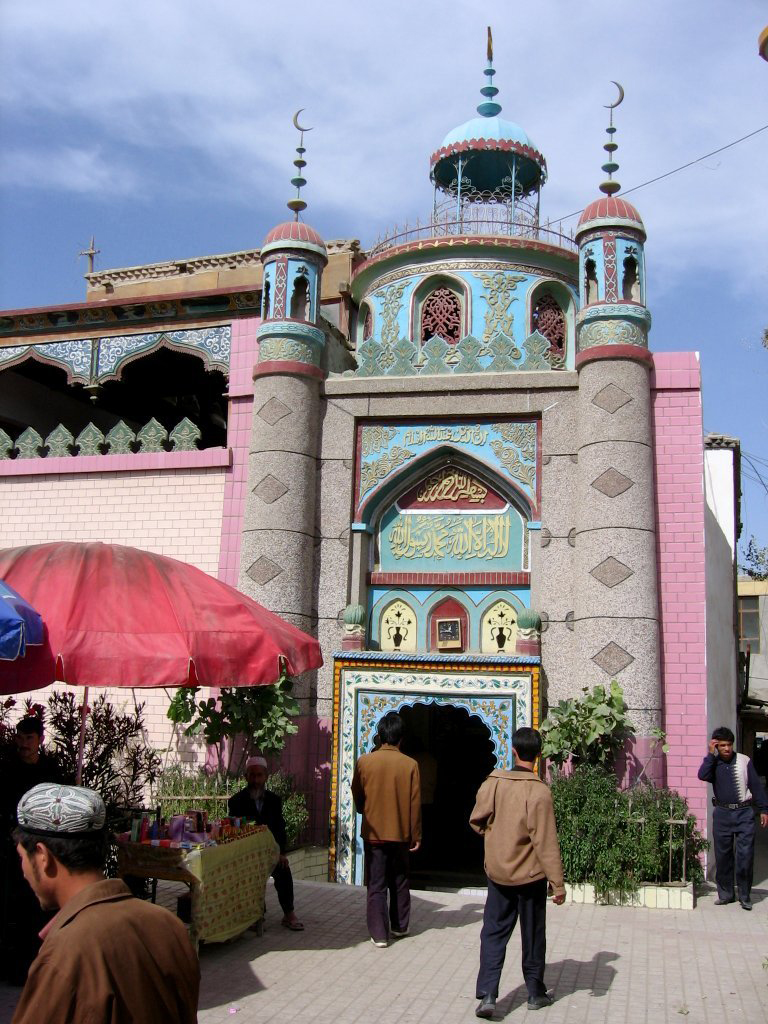
A mosque in Hotan

Hotan is largely dominated by the Uyghurs, and as of 2015, 311,050 of the 348,289 residents of the county were Uyghur, 35,897 were Han Chinese and 1,342 were from other ethnic groups.

In 1940, Owen Lattimore quoted the population of Khotan to be estimated as 26,000.

In 1998 the urban population was recorded at 154,352, 83% of which were Uyghurs, and 17% were Han Chinese.

In 1999, 83.01% of the population was Uyghur and 16.57% of the population was Han Chinese.

In the 2000 census, the population was recorded as 186,123. In the 2010 census figure, the figure had risen to 322,300. The increase in population is partly due to boundary changes.

== Transportation ==
=== Air ===
Hetian Kungang Airport (IATA: HTN) serves the city. It serves regional flights to Ürümqi. Originally a military use airport, it was expanded significantly in 2002 to accommodate higher passenger volumes. It is located 12 km (7.5 mi) south of the city proper.

=== Road ===
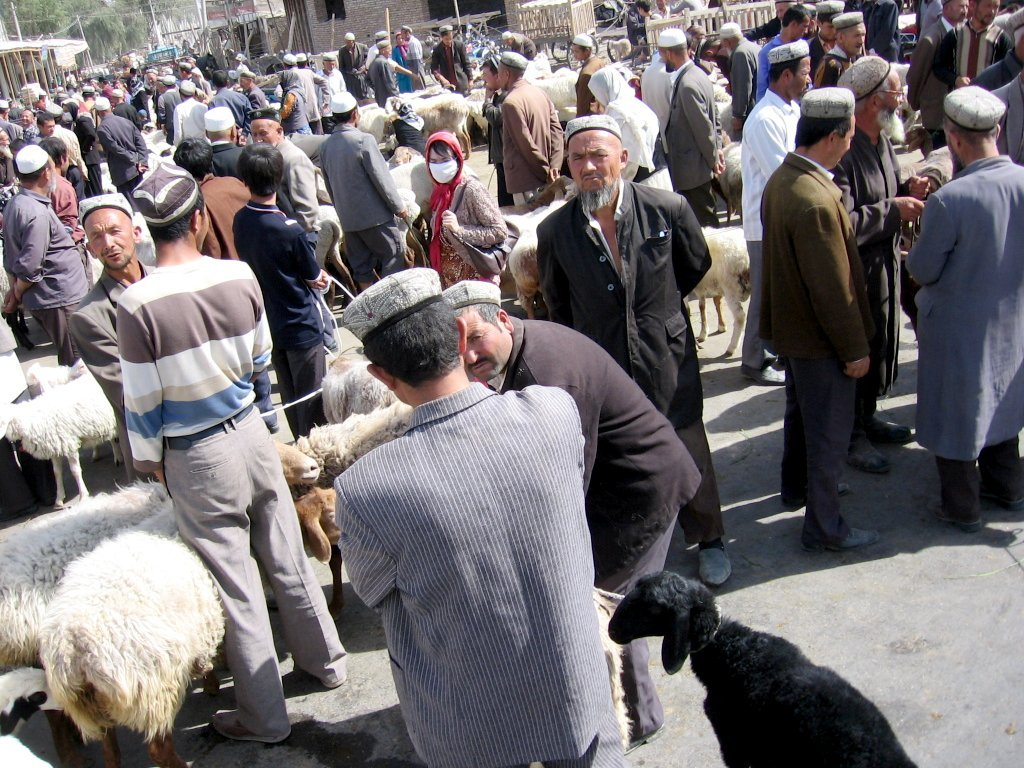
Locals at a busy Hotan market

Hotan is served by China National Highway 315, which runs along the southern Tarim Basin from Ruoqiang to Kashgar, and the Trans-Taklamakan Desert Highway, which run north to Luntai. An expressway is being built between Hotan and Karakax County (Moyu) as of 2014.

=== Rail ===
Hotan is connected to the rest of China's rail network via the Kashgar–Hotan Railway, which opened to freight traffic in December 2010, and passenger service in June 2011. The railway station was constructed by a company under the Xinjiang Production and Construction Corps, and is located in the town of Lasqi (拉斯奎) northwest of the city proper. Passenger train service on this line is limited, with only one train per day, local service 5828/5825, linking the city with Kashgar (8~ hours) and Ürümqi (~34 hours).

=== Buses ===
Regular bus services link Hotan with Kashgar. There is also an express bus to Aksu via the 430 km (270 mi) 'Hotan-Aksu Cross-Desert Highway' which was opened in 2007, travels alongside the intermittent Hotan River, and which takes about 5 or 6 hours. This same bus then goes on to Urumchi taking a total of about 21 hours from Hotan.

== Economy ==
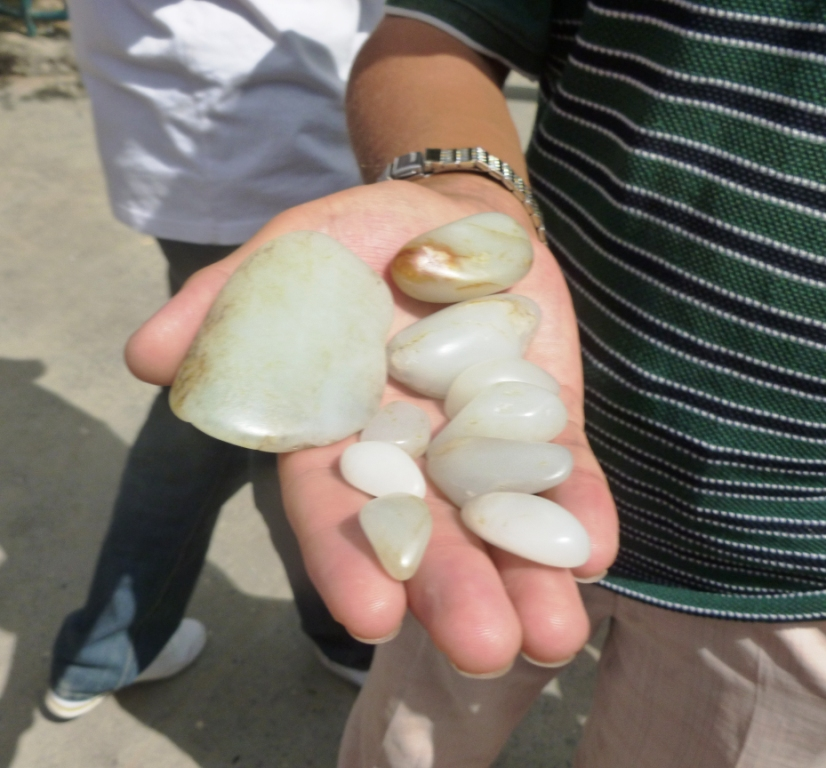
Light coloured or "Mutton fat" jade for sale at Hotan Jade Market

As of 1885, there was about 100,000 acres (662,334 mu) of cultivated land in Khotan.

=== Nephrite jade ===
Chinese historical sources indicate that Hotan was the main source of the nephrite jade used in ancient China. For several hundred years, until they were defeated by the Xiongnu in 176 BCE, the trade of Khotanese jade into China was controlled by the nomadic Yuezhi. The Chinese still refer to the Yurungkash as the White Jade River, alluding to the white jade recovered from its alluvial deposits. The light-colored jade is called "Mutton fat" jade. Most of the jade is now gone, with only a few kilos of good quality jade found yearly. Some is still mined in the Kunlun Mountains to the south in the summer, but it is generally of poorer quality than that found in the rivers.

=== Fabrics and carpets ===
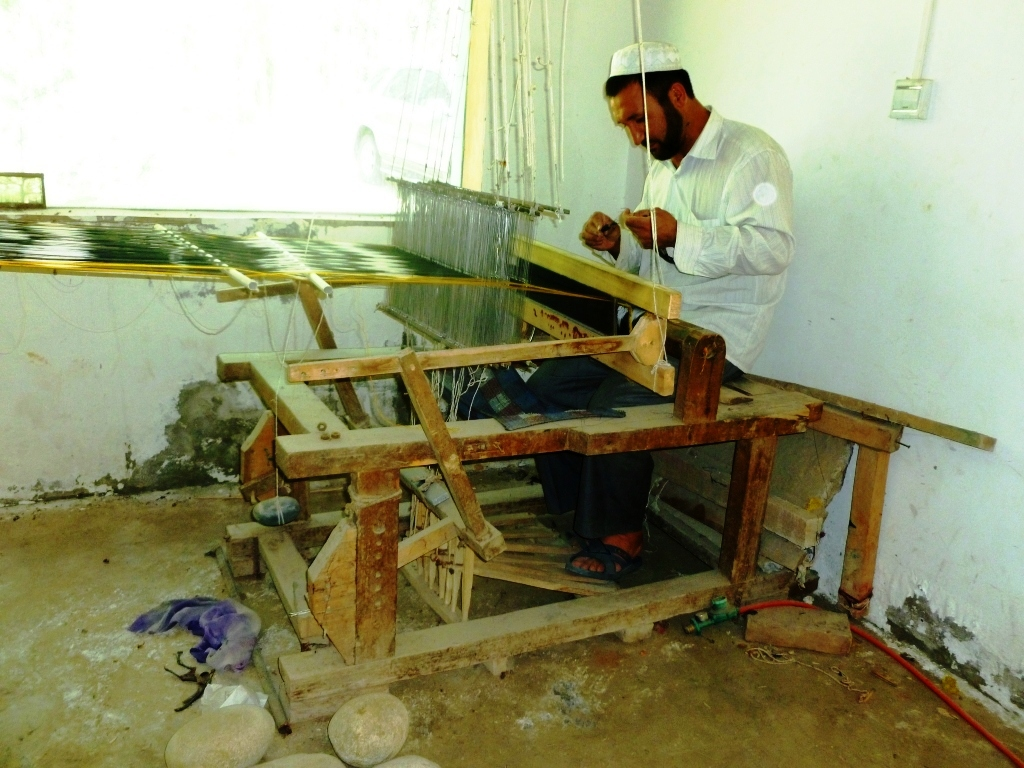
Silk weaving in Hotan

Khotanese textiles were mentioned by Xuanzang, who visited the oasis in 644 CE. In his Biography it is stated: "It produced carpets and fine felt, and the felt-makers also spun coarse and fine silk."

Ancient Chinese-Khotanese relations were so close that the oasis emerged as one of the earliest centres of silk manufacture outside China. There are good reasons to believe that the silk-producing industry flourished in Hotan as early as the 5th century. According to one story, a Chinese princess given in marriage to a Khotan prince brought to the oasis the secret of silk-manufacture, "hiding silkworms in her hair as part of her dowry", probably in the first half of the 1st century CE. It was from Khotan that the eggs of silkworms were smuggled to Iran, reaching Justinian I's Constantinople in 551.

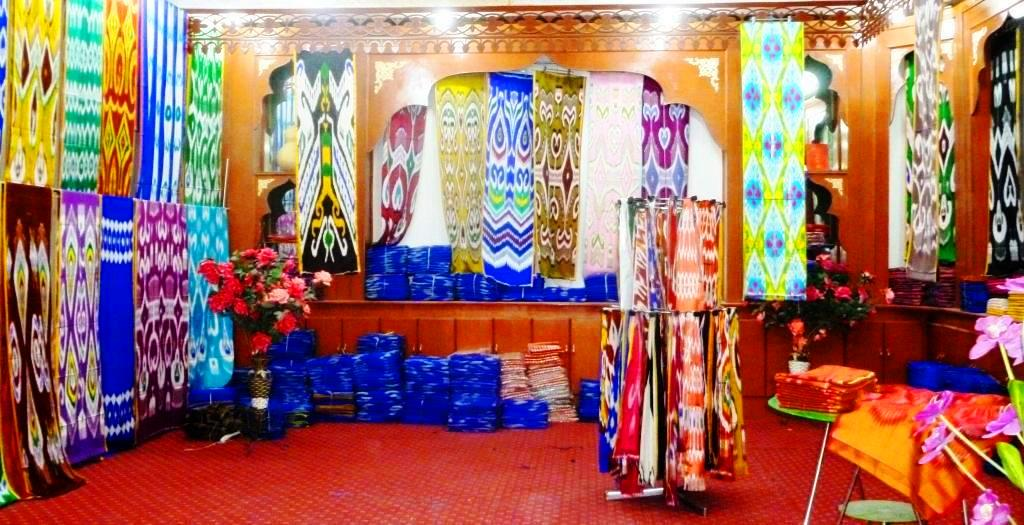
Khotanese silks on display in shop

Silk production is still a major industry employing more than a thousand workers and producing some 150 million metres of silk annually. Silk weaving by Uyghur women is a thriving cottage industry, some of it produced using traditional methods.

Atlas is the fabric used for traditional Uyghur clothing worn by Uyghur women. It is soft, light and graceful tie-dyed silk fabric. It comes various colors, the brighter and rich colors are for small children to young ladies. The gray and dark colors are for elderly women.

The oldest known piece of kilim was obtained by the archaeological explorer Aurel Stein; a fragment from an ancient settlement near Hotan, which was buried by sand drifts about the fourth century CE. The weave is almost identical to that of modern kilims.

Hotanese pile carpets are still highly prized and form an important export.

== Notable persons ==
- Islam Akhun
- Muhammad Amin Bughra
- Nur Ahmadjan Bughra
- Abdullah Bughra

== Gallery ==
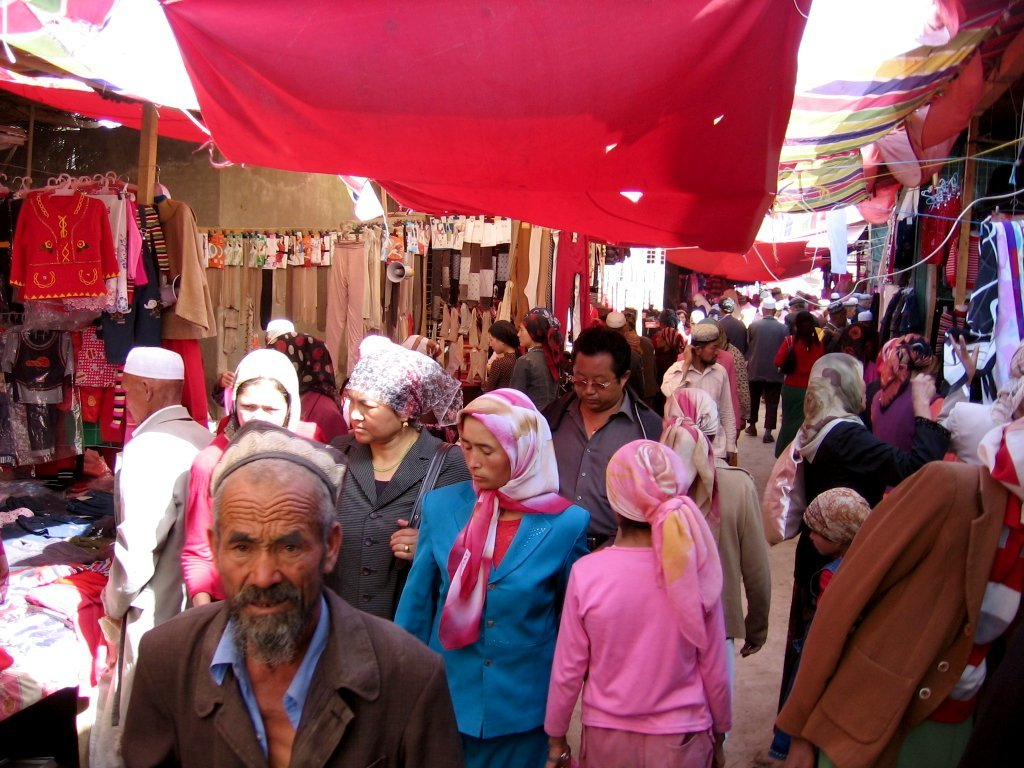
Market in Hotan

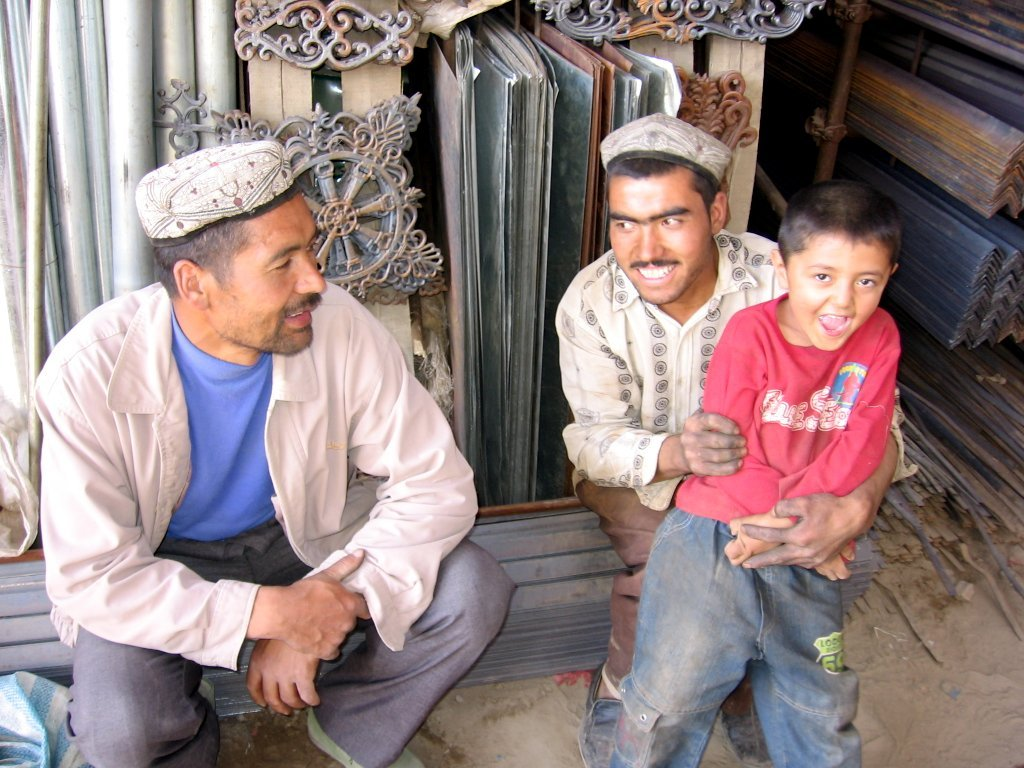
Uyghur people at Sunday market

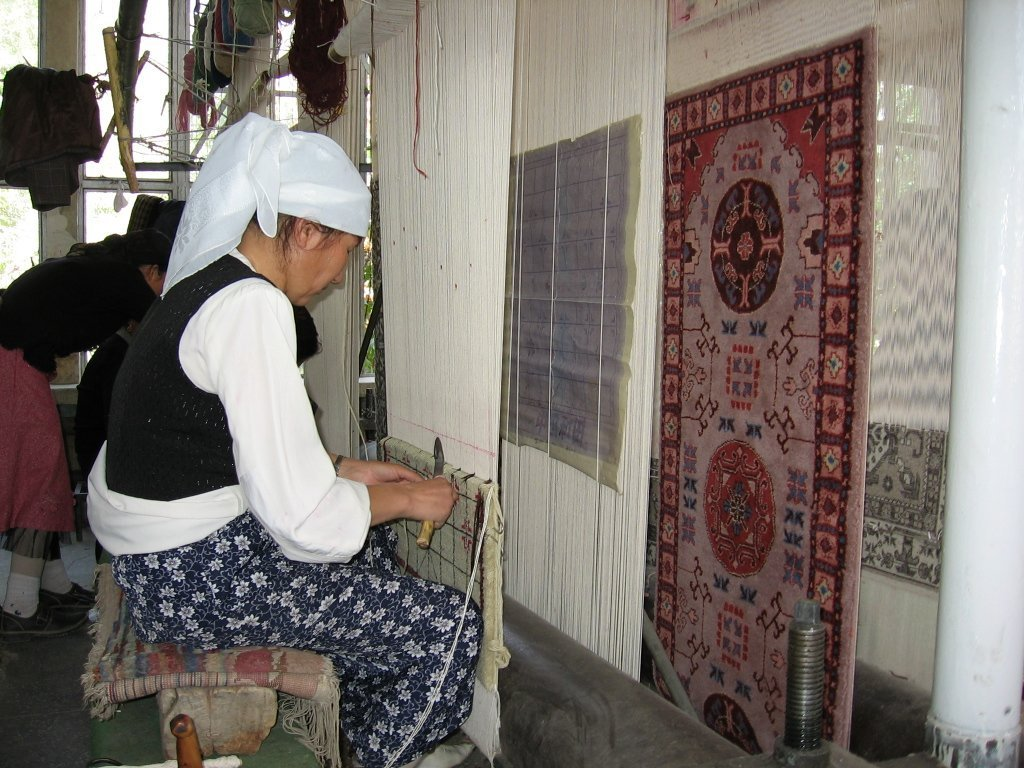
Carpet weaving in Hotan

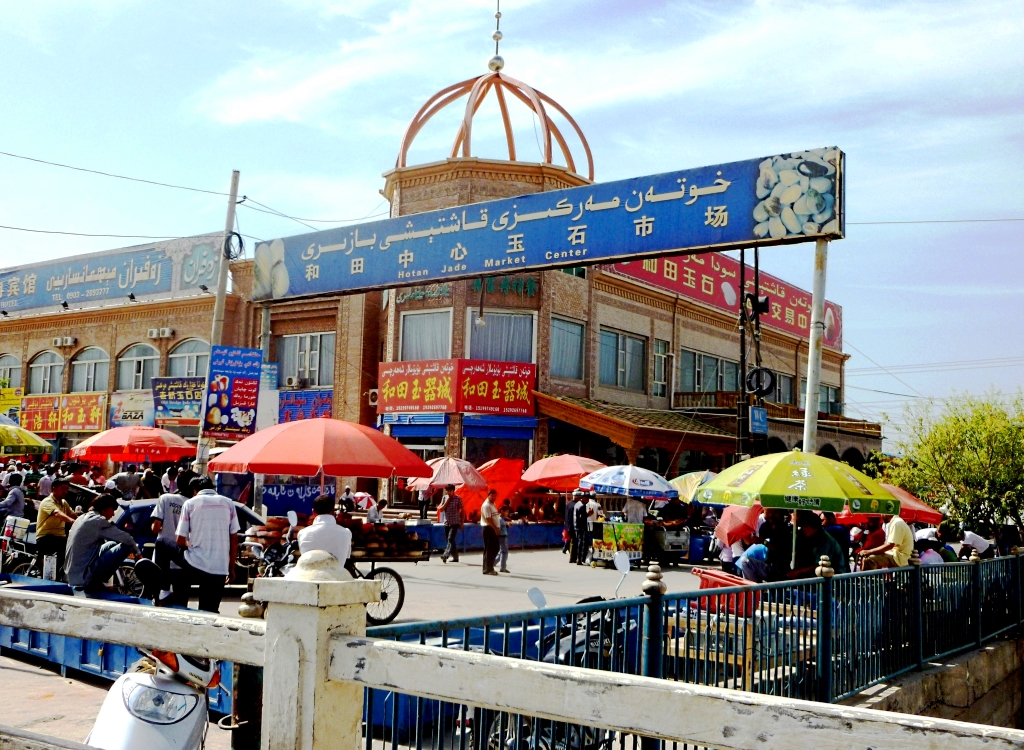
Entrance to the Khotan Jade Market Center

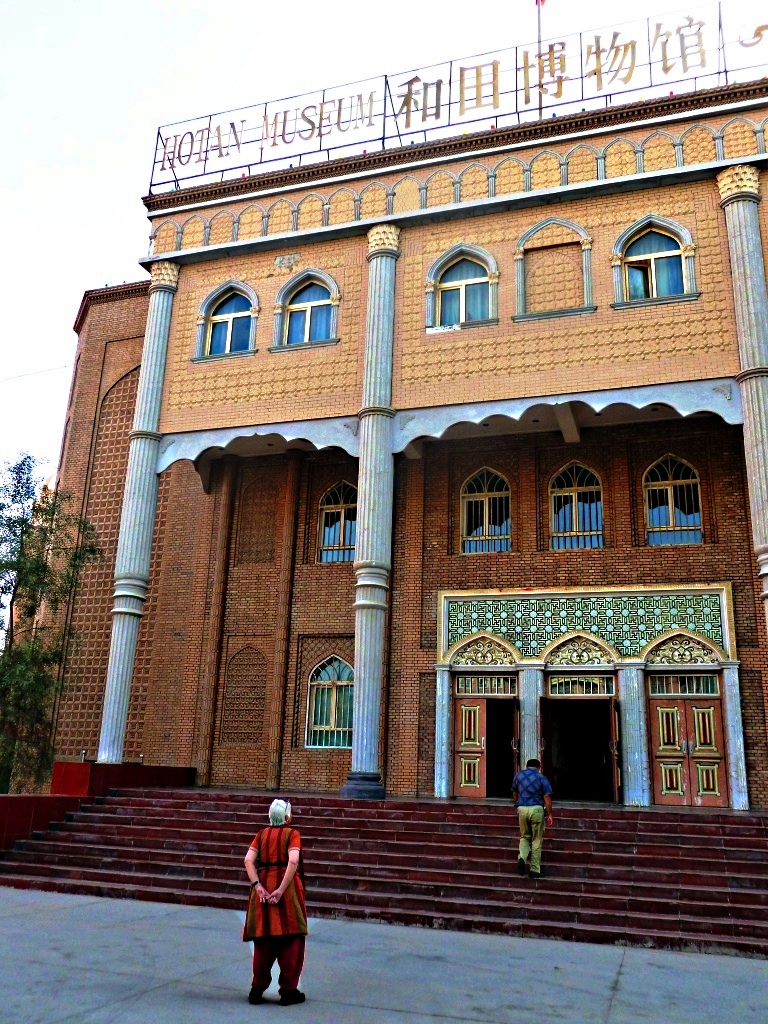
Entrance to the Hotan Cultural Museum

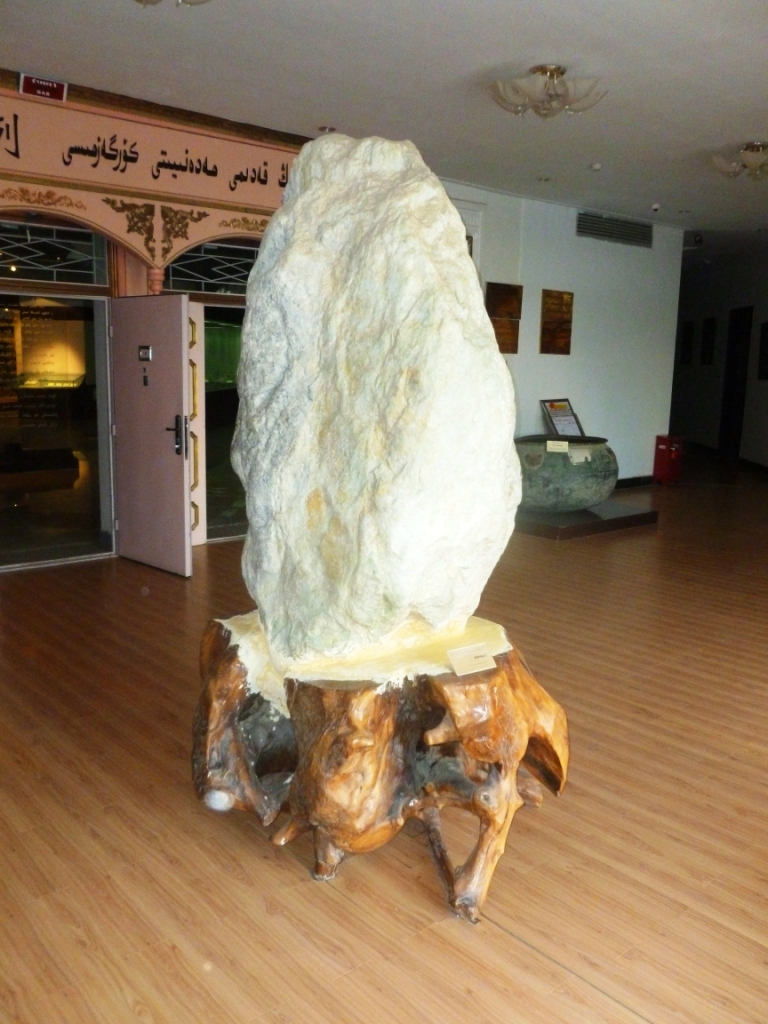
Local jade displayed in the Hotan Cultural Museum lobby.

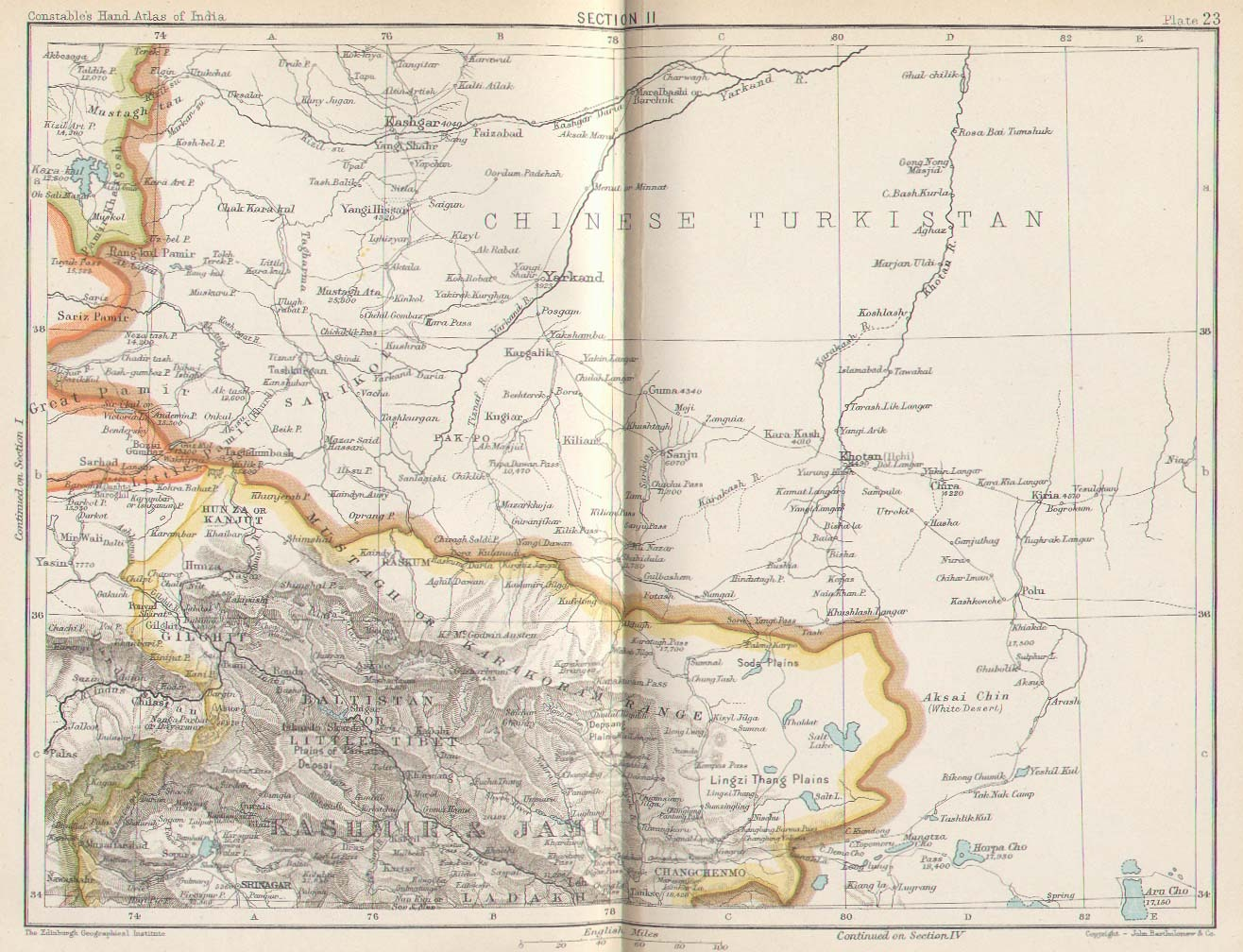
Map of the region including Khotan (Ilchi) (1893)

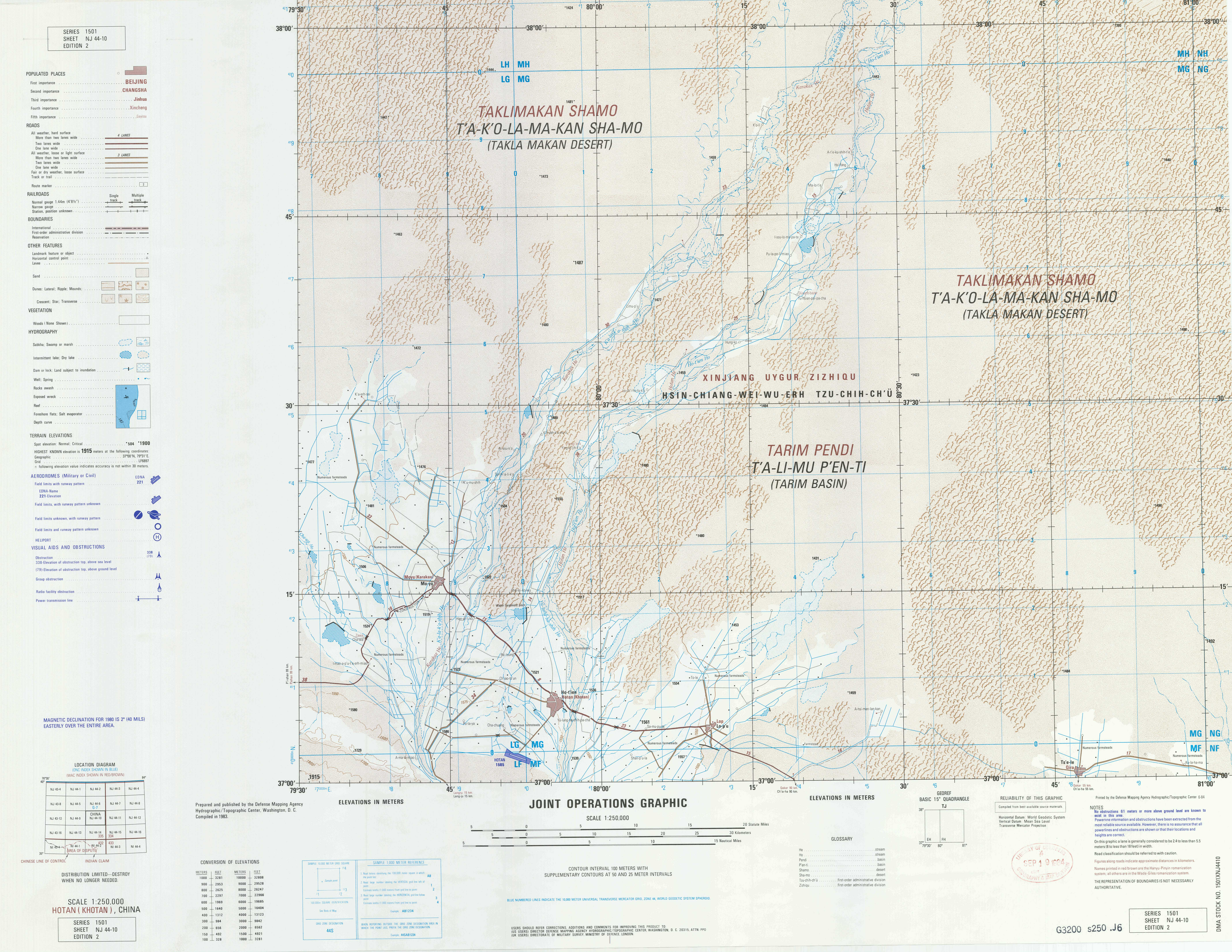
Map including Hotan (Ho-t'ien, Khotan) (DMA, 1983)

== See also ==
- Atlas silk
- Dandan Oilik
- Hotan Cultural Museum
- Khatana
- Kingdom of Khotan
- Silk Road transmission of Buddhism
