= Melikawat =

Archeological site

Coordinates: 36°57′43″N 079°54′12″E

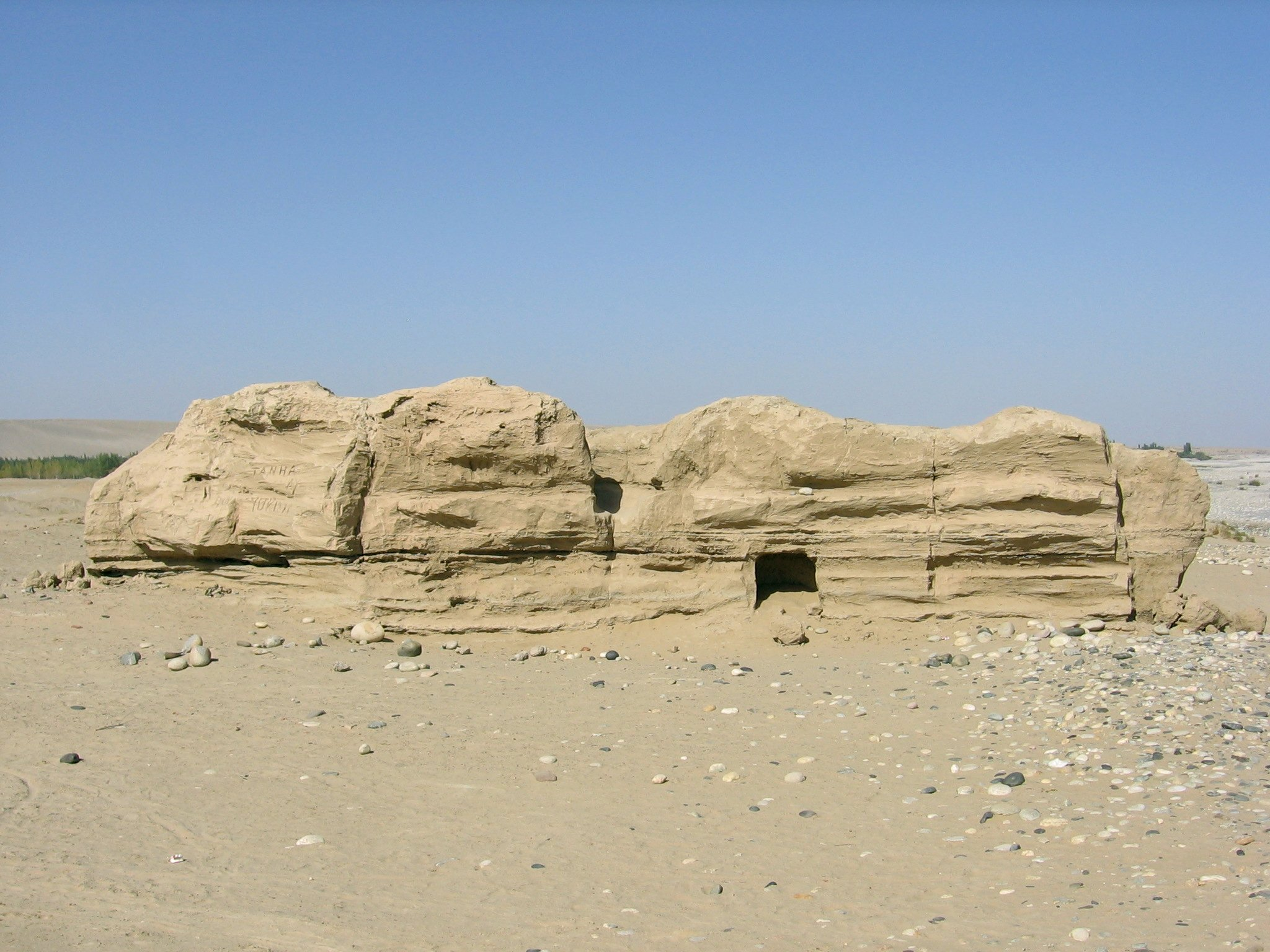
Melikawat ruins

Melikawat (Chinese: 买力克阿瓦提古城; pinyin: Mǎilìkè'āwǎtí Gǔchéng; Chinese: 玛利克瓦特古城; pinyin: Mǎlìkèwǎtè Gǔchéng; there are other Chinese spellings as well) is an archaeological site located 18 miles (30 kilometres) south of Hotan, Xinjiang in north-western China. It was once a city that functioned as a major Buddhist center in the Kingdom of Khotan and may have been the kingdom's capital. The first inhabitants of the site were probably Tocharians. Today, the site contains the remains of walls, glass and pottery.
