= Etles silk =

Traditional Uygher and Uzbek ikat silk fabric made from the silk of the Atlas moth

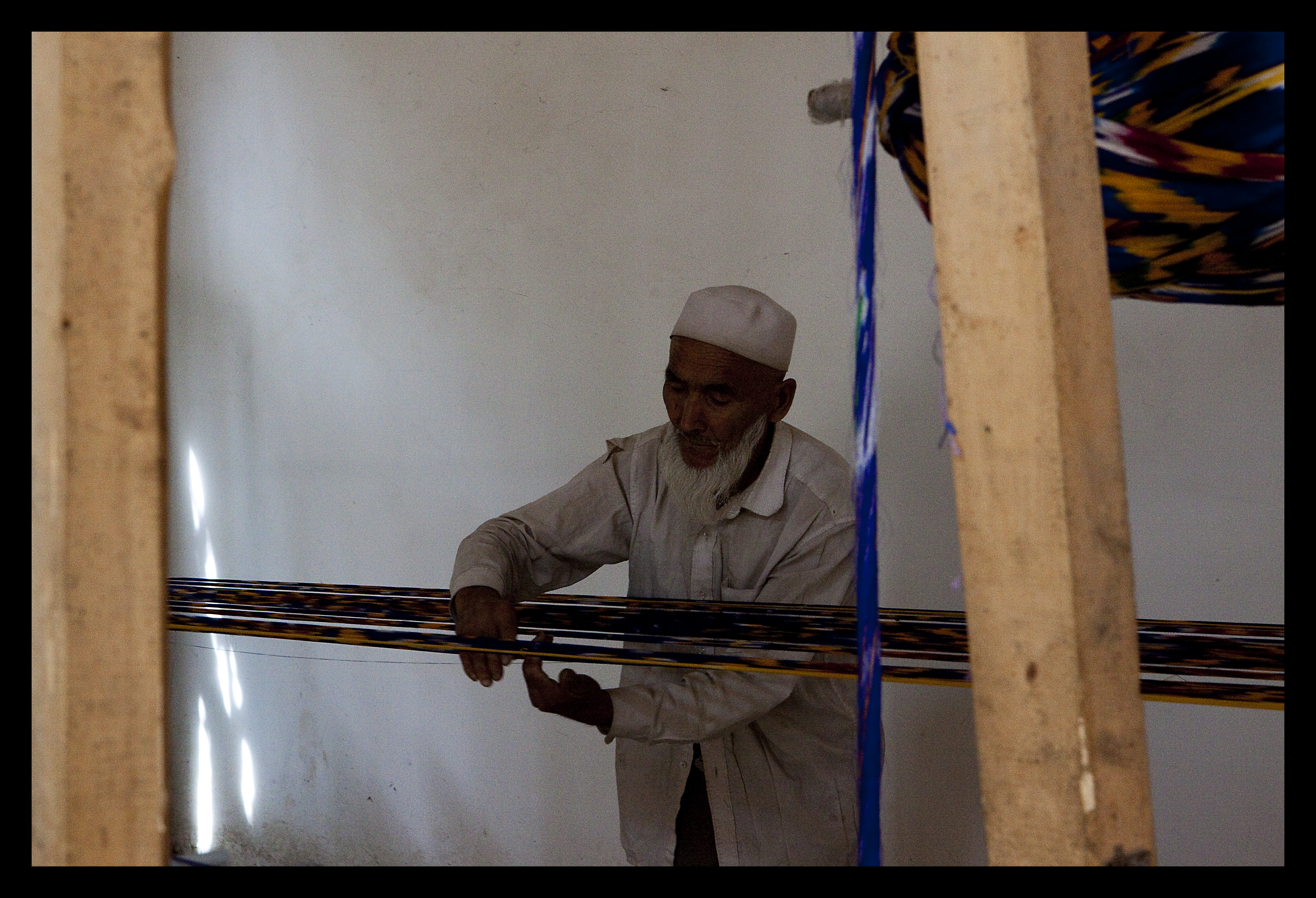
Traditional silk factory in a village outside of Hotan

Etles or Etles silk (Uyghur: ئەتلەس, Етлес, romanized: Etles, Chinese: 艾德莱斯绸; pinyin: Ài dé lái sī chóu, Uzbek: Atlas) is a type of silk ikat fabric traditionally made by the Uyghur and Uzbek peoples. Traditionally used for men's and women's clothing, in the modern day, Etles's unique patterns are no longer limited to application in clothing, and Etles is also used for soft furnishings and accessories.

Etles is made from the silk produced by the Atlas moth. One of the largest production sites is the city of Hotan and its surrounding towns in the Uyghur homeland.
