= Keria =

Keria may refer to:

- Keria Ibrahim, Ethiopian politician
- Keria (gamer), stage name of League of Legends player Ryu Min-seok
- Keria (Greek island) also known as Keros
- Keriya County, county in Xinjiang, China
  - Keriya Town, town in Keriya County
  - Keriya River, river in Xinjiang
- Keria (journal), academic journal from Slovenia
