= Keriya =

Keriya may refer to the following locations:

- China
  - Keriya County, county in Xinjiang, China
  - Keriya Town, town in Keriya County
  - Keriya River, river in Xinjiang
- Israel
  - HaKirya, neighborhood and military base in Tel Aviv, Israel
