= 2014 Yutian earthquake =

Earthquake in China

- Location within Southern Xinjiang
- UTC time: 2014-02-12 09:19:48
- ISC event: 604043291
- USGS-ANSS: ComCat
- Local date: February 12, 2014
- Local time: 17:19:48 CST
- Magnitude: 6.9 M_{w}
- Depth: 12.0 km (7 mi)
- Epicenter: 36.1°N 82.5°E
- Fault: Altyn Tagh fault
- Type: Strike-slip
- Areas affected: Yutian County; Xinjiang, China
- Total damage: 1.08 billion CNY (US$177.5 million)
- Max. intensity: MMI VIII (Severe)
- Casualties: None

The 2014 Yutian earthquake struck Xinjiang on 12 February at 17:19 Beijing Time. The epicenter was located in Aqiang Township, Yutian County. The United States Geological Survey reported its magnitude to be 6.9. News reports indicate that no people were killed, but the earthquake could be felt in the seat of Yutian County, Aqiang Township, and Aksu Prefecture far to the north. The earthquake was reported to be felt in Ngari, Zanda and Tholing, and as far away as Uttarakhand, Himachal Pradesh, Uttaranchal, Kashmir, Delhi, Punjab, Haryana, parts of Uttar Pradesh and Rajasthan, northern Pakistan, western Nepal, eastern Afghanistan, Tajikistan, Kyrgyzstan and Almaty, in Kazakhstan.

== See also ==
- List of earthquakes in 2014
- List of earthquakes in China
