= Tuanjie Square =

Square in Hotan, China

- Public square
- Unity Square
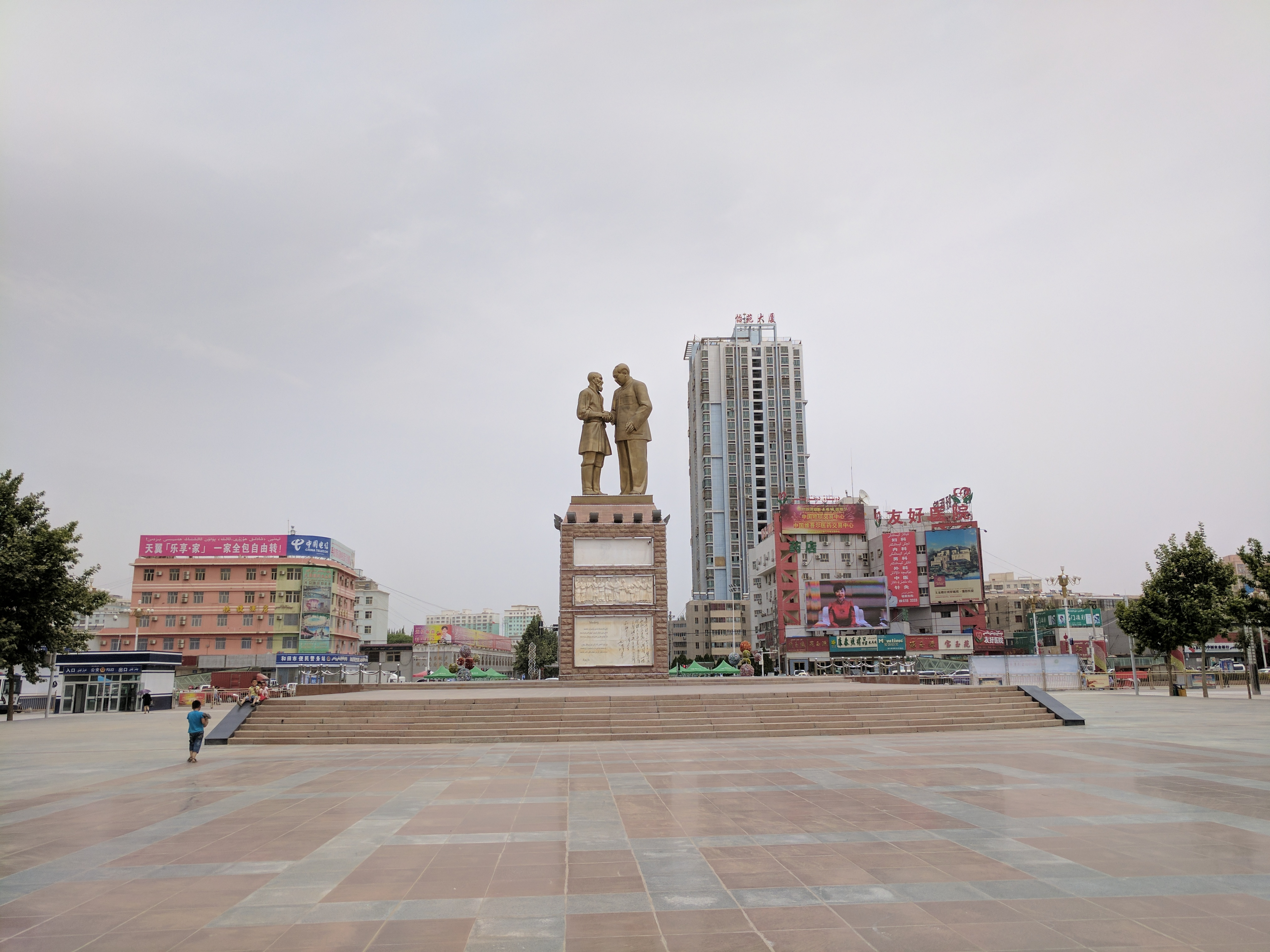
- A monument depicting Kurban Tulum shaking hands with Mao Zedong stands in the centre of Tuanjie Square.
- Dimensions: 250 m × 200 m (820 ft × 660 ft)
- Area: 50 km^{2} (19 sq mi)
- Location: Hotan, Xinjiang, China
- Location within Xinjiang
- Coordinates: 37°06′38″N 79°55′22″E

Tuanjie Square

Chinese name
- Simplified Chinese: 团结广场
- Traditional Chinese: 團結廣場
Transcriptions
Standard Mandarin
- Hanyu Pinyin: tuánjié guǎngchǎng

Uyghur name
- Uyghur: ئىتتىپاق مەيدانى
Transcriptions
- Latin Yëziqi: ittipaq meydani

Tuanjie Square or Unity Square (Chinese: 团结广场; Uyghur: ئىتتىپاق مەيدانى) is the main public square of Hotan, a major town in southwestern Xinjiang near the border with the Tibet Autonomous Region. The square is 250 metres (820 ft) long from north to south, and 200 metres (660 ft) wide from east to west. A night market is located in the southeast corner of the square, frequented by locals and tourists alike.

Located in the town's centre, the square is so named because its purpose is to promote unity among the various ethnic groups in the region. A statue of Uyghur farmer Kurban Tulum shaking hands with Chinese communist leader Mao Zedong stands in the centre of the square. It is meant to show unity between Xinjiang's two largest ethnic groups, the Uyghurs and Han Chinese.

== See also ==
- Propaganda in the People's Republic of China
