= Yutian County, Xinjiang =

Yutian County كېرىيە ناھىيىسى (Uyghur) 于田县 (Chinese) Keriya County
- County
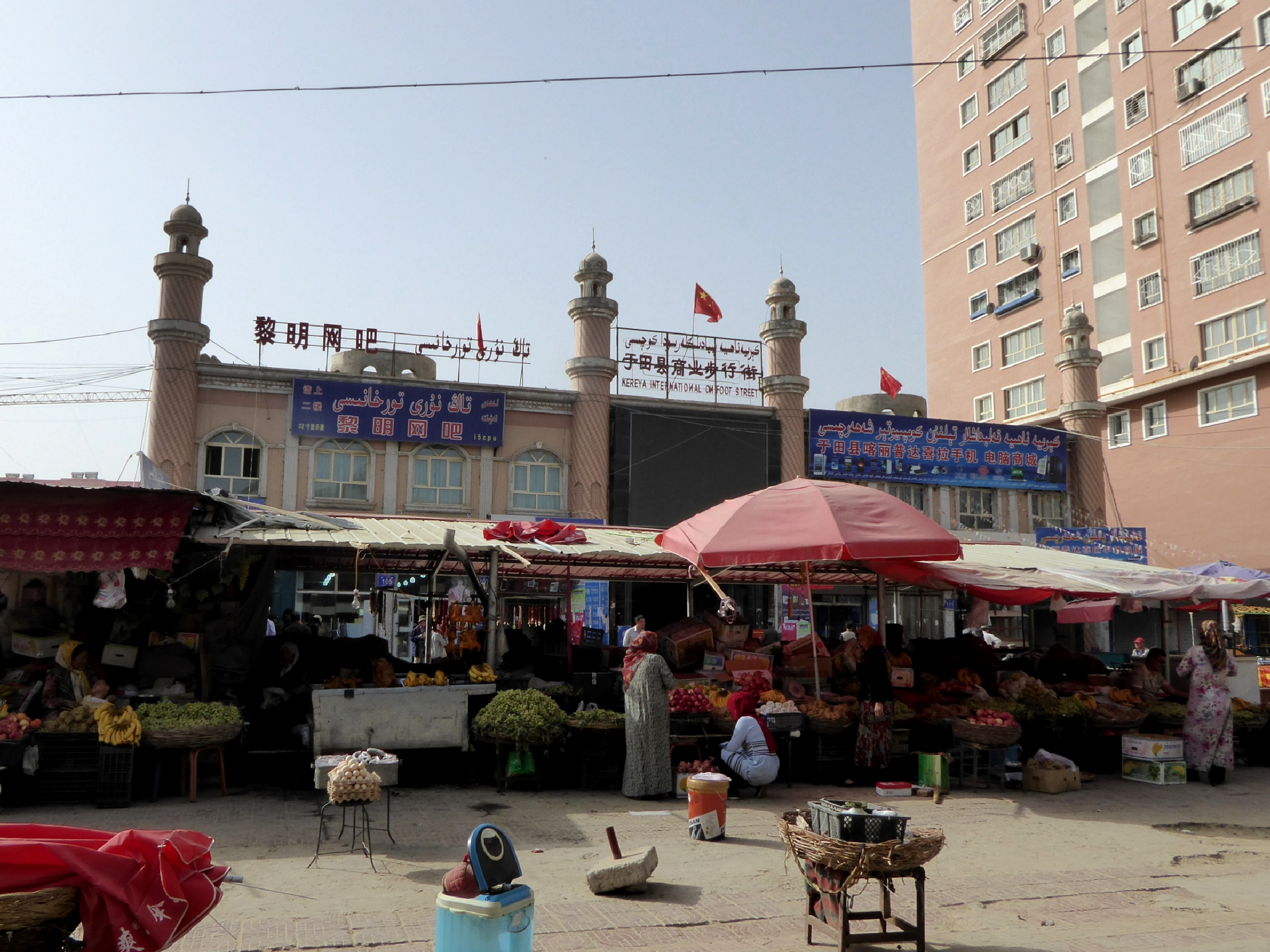
- Kereya International On Foot Street

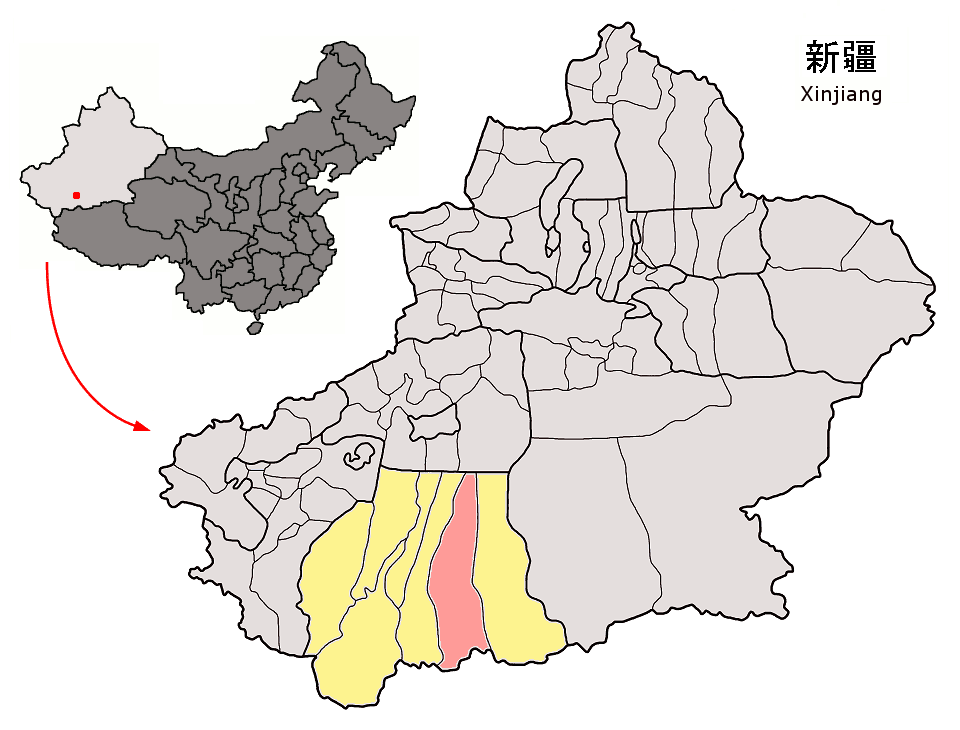
- Location of the county (red) within Hotan Prefecture (yellow) and Xinjiang

- Location of the seat in Xinjiang Yutian (Xinjiang) Yutian (China)
- Coordinates: 36°52′N 81°42′E
- Country: China
- Autonomous region: Xinjiang
- Prefecture: Hotan
- County seat: Mughalla (Keriya)

Area
  - Total: 39,094.83 km^{2} (15,094.60 sq mi)

Population (2020)
  - Total: 257,038
  - Density: 6.57473/km^{2} (17.0285/sq mi)

Ethnic groups
  - Major ethnic groups: Uyghur
- Time zone: UTC+8 (China Standard (Note: Locals in Xinjiang frequently observe UTC+6 (Xinjiang Time), 2 hours behind Beijing.))
- Postal code: 848400
- Website: www.xjyt.gov.cn (in Chinese)

Yutian County, Xinjiang

Chinese name
- Simplified Chinese: 于田县
- Traditional Chinese: 于田縣
Transcriptions
Standard Mandarin
- Hanyu Pinyin: Yútián Xiàn
- Wade–Giles: Yü^{2}-tʻien^{2} Hsien^{4}

Alternative Chinese name
- Simplified Chinese: 玉田县
- Traditional Chinese: 玉田縣
Transcriptions
Standard Mandarin
- Hanyu Pinyin: Yùtián Xiàn

Second alternative Chinese name
- Simplified Chinese: 克里雅县
- Traditional Chinese: 克里雅縣
Transcriptions
Standard Mandarin
- Hanyu Pinyin: Kèlǐyǎ Xiàn

Uyghur name
- Uyghur: كېرىيە ناھىيىسى
Transcriptions
- Latin Yëziqi: Këriye Nahiyisi
- Yengi Yeziⱪ: Keriyə Naⱨiyisi
- SASM/GNC: Keriya Nahiyisi
- Siril Yëziqi: Керийә Наһийиси

Yutian County (Chinese: 于田县), also transliterated from Uyghur as Keriya County (Uyghur: كېرىيە ناھىيىسى; Chinese: 克里雅县), is a county in Hotan Prefecture, Xinjiang Uyghur Autonomous Region, China. It is based at the Keriya Town, and is separate from Hotan County, which is another county in the same prefecture. The Yutian County has an area of 39,023 km^{2} (15,067 sq mi). According to the 2002 census, it has a population of 220,000. The county is bounded on the north by Aksu Prefecture, on the east by Minfeng/Niya County, on the west by Qira County and on the south by the Rutog and Gertse counties of the Tibet Autonomous Region.

== Name ==
The county derives its Chinese name from the Kingdom of Khotan. The name was written as '于闐' at that time. This was later changed to '玉田' (literally, Jade Field) following the adoption of Simplified Chinese and eventually to '于田' in 1959. The three names have a similar pronunciation in Mandarin Chinese.

"Keriya", the Latin transliteration of the Uyghur name for the county, is derived from the name of the Keriya River.

Yutian County is dubbed the "Home of Jade".

== History ==
The ancient name of Keriya was Yumi (扜彌, Gyuymi, Umi). The name Yumi was used by the Chinese envoy Zhang Qian in his 125 BCE report on his embassy's travels.

Yutian County (于阗县) was formed in 1882, its administrative center was Karakash, and Keriya was only a post station. In 1885, the administrative center of the county was moved to Keriya.

Aurel Stein travelled along the Keriya River in his early 20th century expeditions in the region.

In 1920, the area was part of Hotan Dao (和闐道).

In 1950, the area was part of Hotan Special Area (和闐專區).

In 1959, the Chinese character name for the county was set as '于田'.

In 1977, the area became part of Hotan Prefecture.

In November 1980, the Yutian hydroelectric plant, located on the Keriya River, went into operation.

On March 21, 2008, the county was at the epicenter of a 7.1/7.3 magnitude earthquake.

In February 2014, the county was at the epicenter of the 6.8 magnitude 2014 Yutian earthquake. No injuries or deaths were reported.

In 2018, the Financial Times reported that the Yutian county vocational training centre, among the largest of the Xinjiang re-education camps, had opened a forced labour facility including eight factories spanning shoemaking, mobile phone assembly and tea packaging, giving a base monthly salary of ¥1,500 ($220). Between 2016 and 2018, the centre expanded 269 percent in total area.

In 2018, Regiment 225 (兵团二二五团), part of Kunyu, was listed as part of the county.

== Administrative divisions ==
Yutian county includes two towns and thirteen townships:

Name	Simplified Chinese	Hanyu Pinyin	Uyghur (UEY)	Uyghur Latin (ULY)	Administrative division code
Towns
Mughalla Town	木尕拉镇	Mùgǎlā Zhèn	مۇغاللا بازىرى	mughalla baziri	653226100
Xambabazar Town	先拜巴扎镇	Xiānbàibāzhā Zhèn	شەنبە بازار بازىرى	shenbebazar baziri	653226101
Townships
Jay Township	加依乡	Jiāyī Xiāng	جاي يېزىسى	jay yëzisi	653226200
Kokyar Township	科克亚乡	Kēkèyà Xiāng	كۆكيار يېزىسى	kökyar yëzisi	653226201
Aral Township	阿热勒乡	Ārèlè Xiāng	ئارال يېزىسى	Aral yëzisi	653226202
Arix Township	阿日希乡	Ārìxī Xiāng	ئارىش يېزىسى	Arish yëzisi	653226203
Lengger Township (Bogazlanggar)	兰干乡	Lángàn Xiāng	لەڭگەر يېزىسى	lengger yëzisi	653226204
Siyak Township	斯也克乡	Sīyěkè Xiāng	سىيەك يېزىسى	siyek yëzisi	653226205
Togragaz Township (Tagdaxman)	托格日尕孜乡	Tuōgérìgǎzī Xiāng	توغراغاز يېزىسى	toghraghaz yëzisi	653226206
Karaki Township	喀拉克尔乡	Kālākè'ěr Xiāng	قارقى يېزىسى	qarqi yëzisi	653226207
Oytograk Township	奥依托格拉克乡	Àoyītuōgélākè Xiāng	ئويتوغراق يېزىسى	Oytoghraq yëzisi	653226208
Aqqan Township	阿羌乡	Āqiāng Xiāng	ئاچچان يېزىسى	Achchan yëzisi	653226209
Yengibag Township	英巴格乡	Yīngbāgé Xiāng	يېڭىباغ يېزىسى	yëngibagh yëzisi	653226210
Shiwol Township	希吾勒乡	Xīwúlè Xiāng	شىۋول يېزىسى	shiwol yëzisi	653226211
Darya Boyi Township	达里雅布依乡	Dálǐyǎbùyī Xiāng	دەريا بۇيى يېزىسى	deryabuyi yëzisi	653226212

== Climate ==
Climate data for Yutian, elevation 1,422 m (4,665 ft), (1991–2020 normals, extremes 1981–present)
Month	Jan	Feb	Mar	Apr	May	Jun	Jul	Aug	Sep	Oct	Nov	Dec	Year
Record high °C (°F)	18.9 (66.0)	23.8 (74.8)	32.3 (90.1)	36.0 (96.8)	37.8 (100.0)	39.2 (102.6)	41.4 (106.5)	40.5 (104.9)	37.3 (99.1)	31.5 (88.7)	24.4 (75.9)	18.7 (65.7)	41.4 (106.5)
Mean daily maximum °C (°F)	1.7 (35.1)	7.7 (45.9)	17.2 (63.0)	24.5 (76.1)	28.3 (82.9)	31.2 (88.2)	32.7 (90.9)	31.5 (88.7)	28.0 (82.4)	21.6 (70.9)	12.5 (54.5)	3.9 (39.0)	20.1 (68.1)
Daily mean °C (°F)	−4.8 (23.4)	0.9 (33.6)	9.6 (49.3)	16.4 (61.5)	20.2 (68.4)	23.5 (74.3)	24.9 (76.8)	23.7 (74.7)	19.1 (66.4)	11.5 (52.7)	4.0 (39.2)	−2.8 (27.0)	12.2 (53.9)
Mean daily minimum °C (°F)	−10.2 (13.6)	−5.1 (22.8)	2.4 (36.3)	8.7 (47.7)	12.8 (55.0)	16.7 (62.1)	18.4 (65.1)	17.1 (62.8)	11.8 (53.2)	3.5 (38.3)	−2.6 (27.3)	−7.8 (18.0)	5.5 (41.9)
Record low °C (°F)	−21.7 (−7.1)	−22.8 (−9.0)	−9.3 (15.3)	−1.4 (29.5)	0.7 (33.3)	6.5 (43.7)	10.0 (50.0)	6.9 (44.4)	1.0 (33.8)	−4.2 (24.4)	−11.6 (11.1)	−22.6 (−8.7)	−22.8 (−9.0)
Average precipitation mm (inches)	1.8 (0.07)	1.7 (0.07)	1.9 (0.07)	4.2 (0.17)	5.9 (0.23)	14.5 (0.57)	11.8 (0.46)	7.0 (0.28)	8.3 (0.33)	0.8 (0.03)	0.4 (0.02)	0.7 (0.03)	59 (2.33)
Average precipitation days (≥ 0.1 mm)	2.3	1.4	0.7	1.0	2.3	4.3	3.5	2.4	1.7	0.4	0.3	1.1	21.4
Average snowy days	4.7	2.2	0.7	0.1	0	0	0	0	0	0	0.7	3.2	11.6
Average relative humidity (%)	55	46	32	31	39	44	50	53	53	49	46	55	46
Mean monthly sunshine hours	206.0	203.8	234.8	240.9	264.7	260.0	254.8	240.6	256.0	279.9	239.2	212.8	2,893.5
Percentage possible sunshine	66	66	63	60	60	59	58	58	70	82	79	71	66
Source: China Meteorological Administration

== Economy ==
The county is known for its production of jade. Agriculture and livestock farming in the county produces corn, wheat, rice, cotton, grapes and melons. Industries in the county include jade mining, cotton ginning, tractor repair and preserved fruit processing.

== Demographics ==
As of 2015, 277,206 of the 282,182 residents of the county were Uyghur, 4,678 were Han Chinese and 298 were from other ethnic groups.

In the late 2010s, Uyghurs made up 98.3% of the population of the county.

As of 1999, 98.56% of the population of Keriya (Yutian) County was Uyghur and 1.37% of the population was Han Chinese.

== Transportation ==
- China National Highway 315
- Yutian Wanfang Airport
- Yutian railway station on Hotan–Ruoqiang railway

== Notable persons ==
- Kurban Tulum, promoted by the Chinese Communist Party as a symbol of unity with the Uyghurs

== Gallery ==
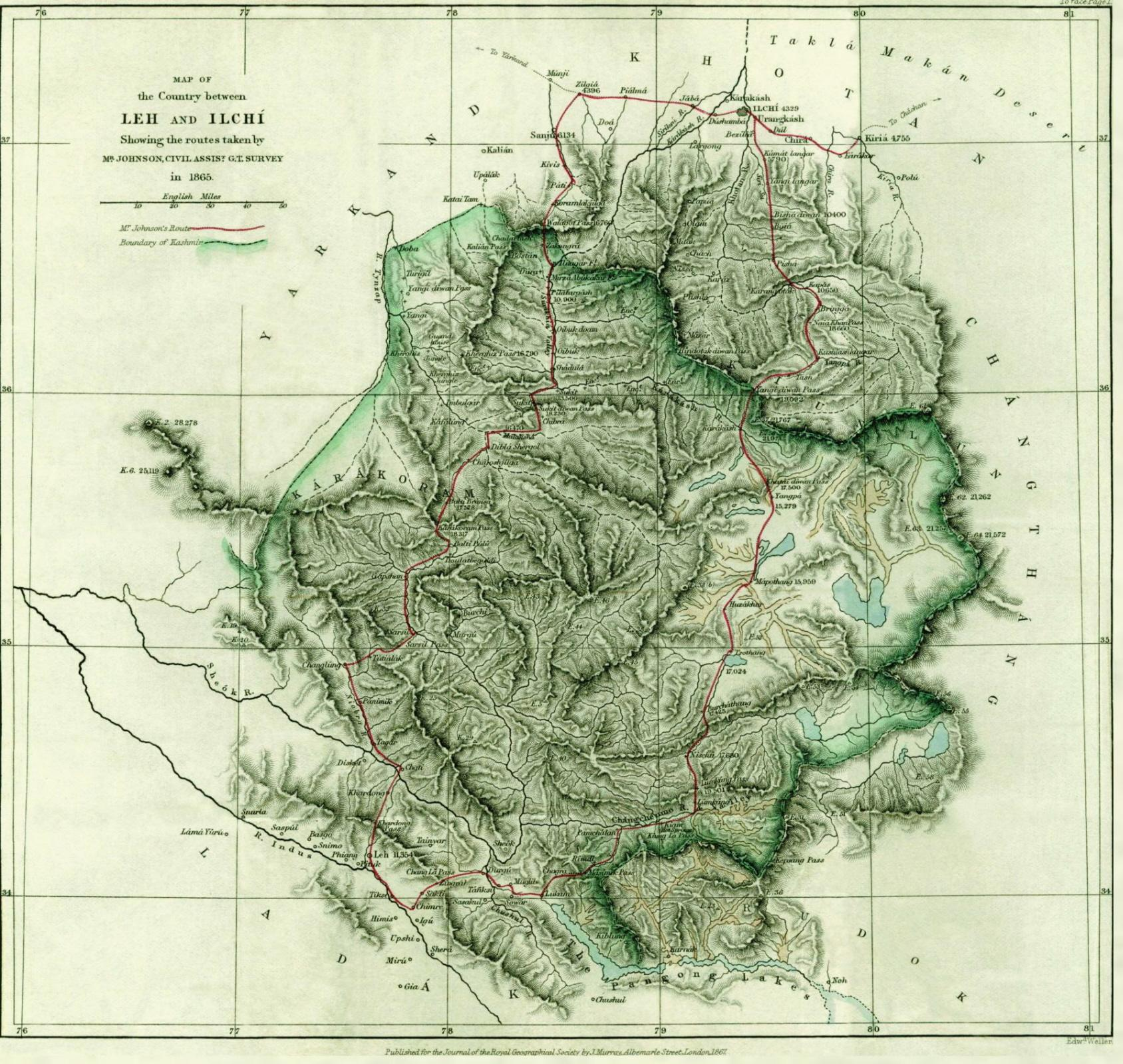
Map including Kiriá (1865)

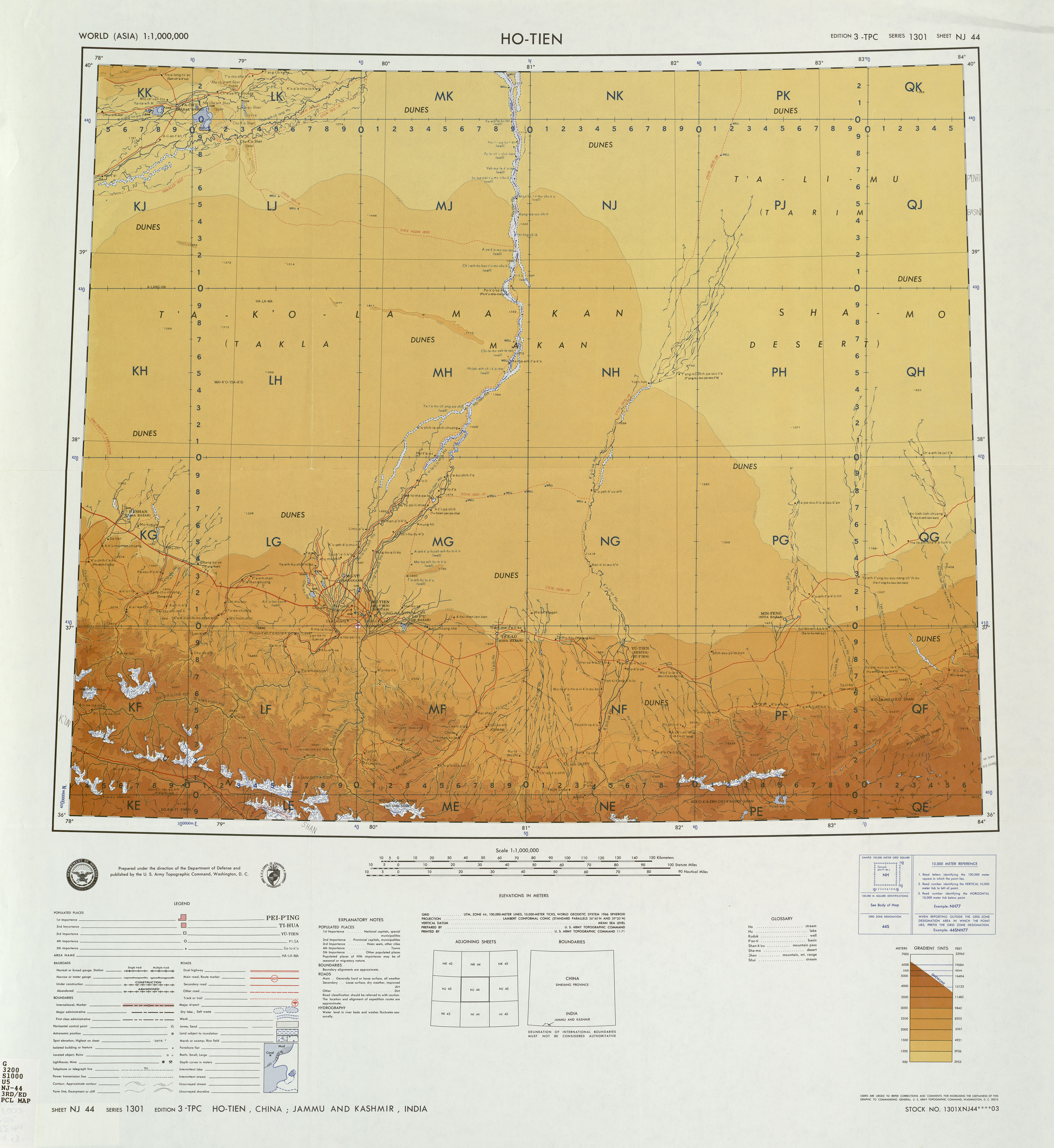
Map including Yutian (labeled as YÜ-TIEN (KERIYA) (YÜ-T'IEN)) and surrounding region in the International Map of the World (USATC, 1971) (Note: (from map: "DELINEATION OF INTERNATIONAL BOUNDARIES MUST NOT BE CONSIDERED AUTHORITATIVE"))

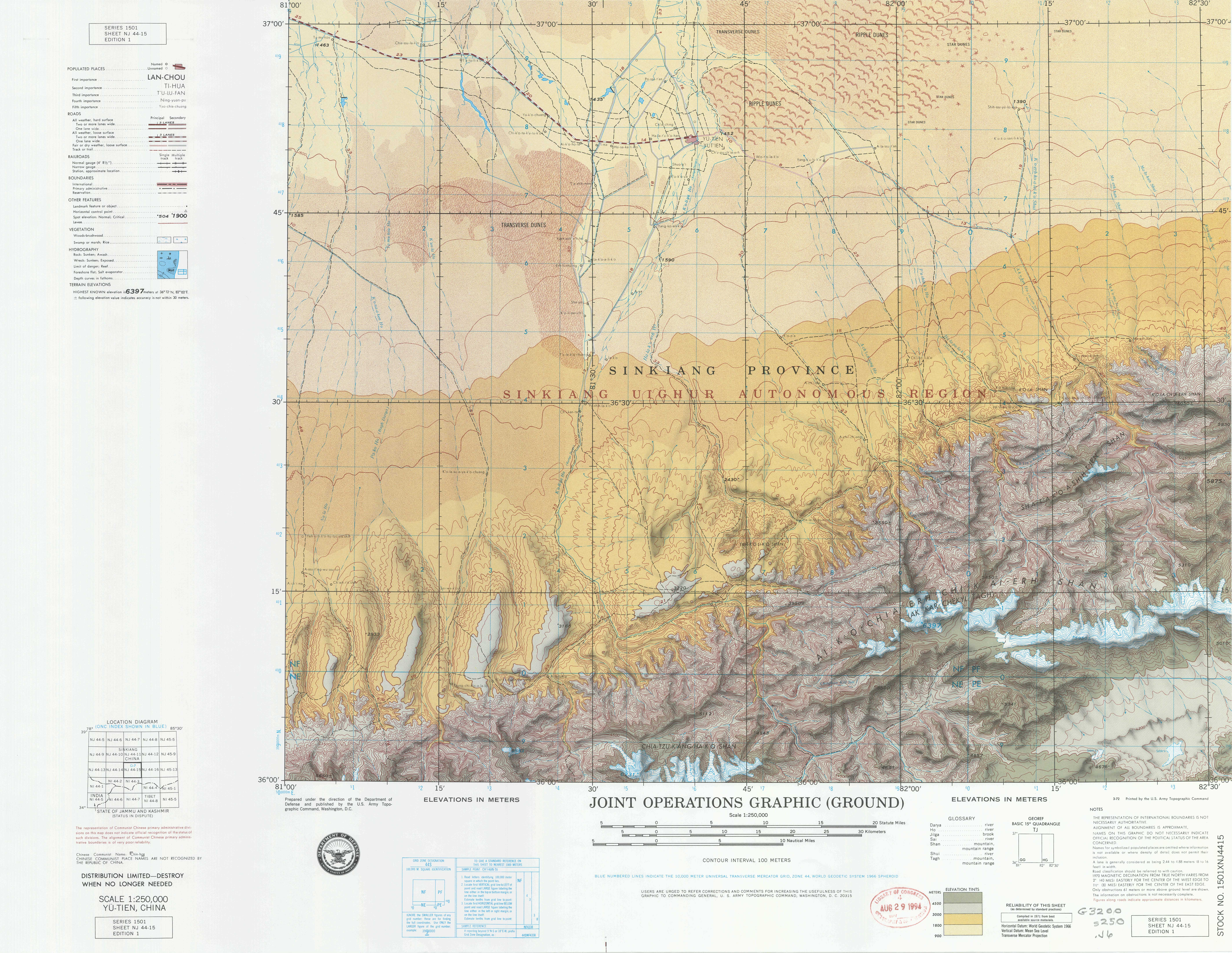
Map including Keriya (labeled as YÜ-TIEN (YUT'IEN) (ATC, 1971)

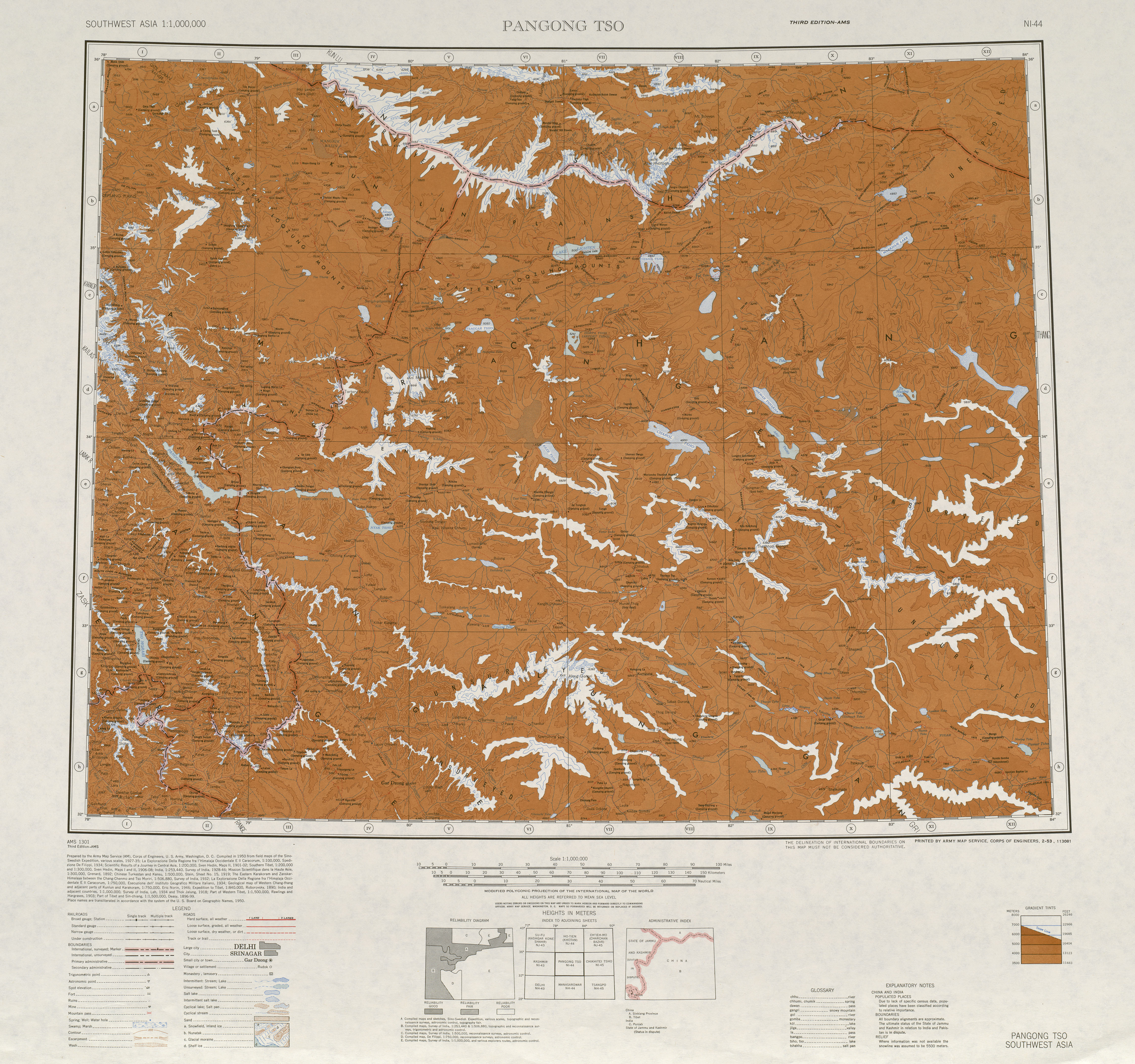
Map including the southern part of Yutian/Keriya County and the county's border with Tibet (AMS, 1950)

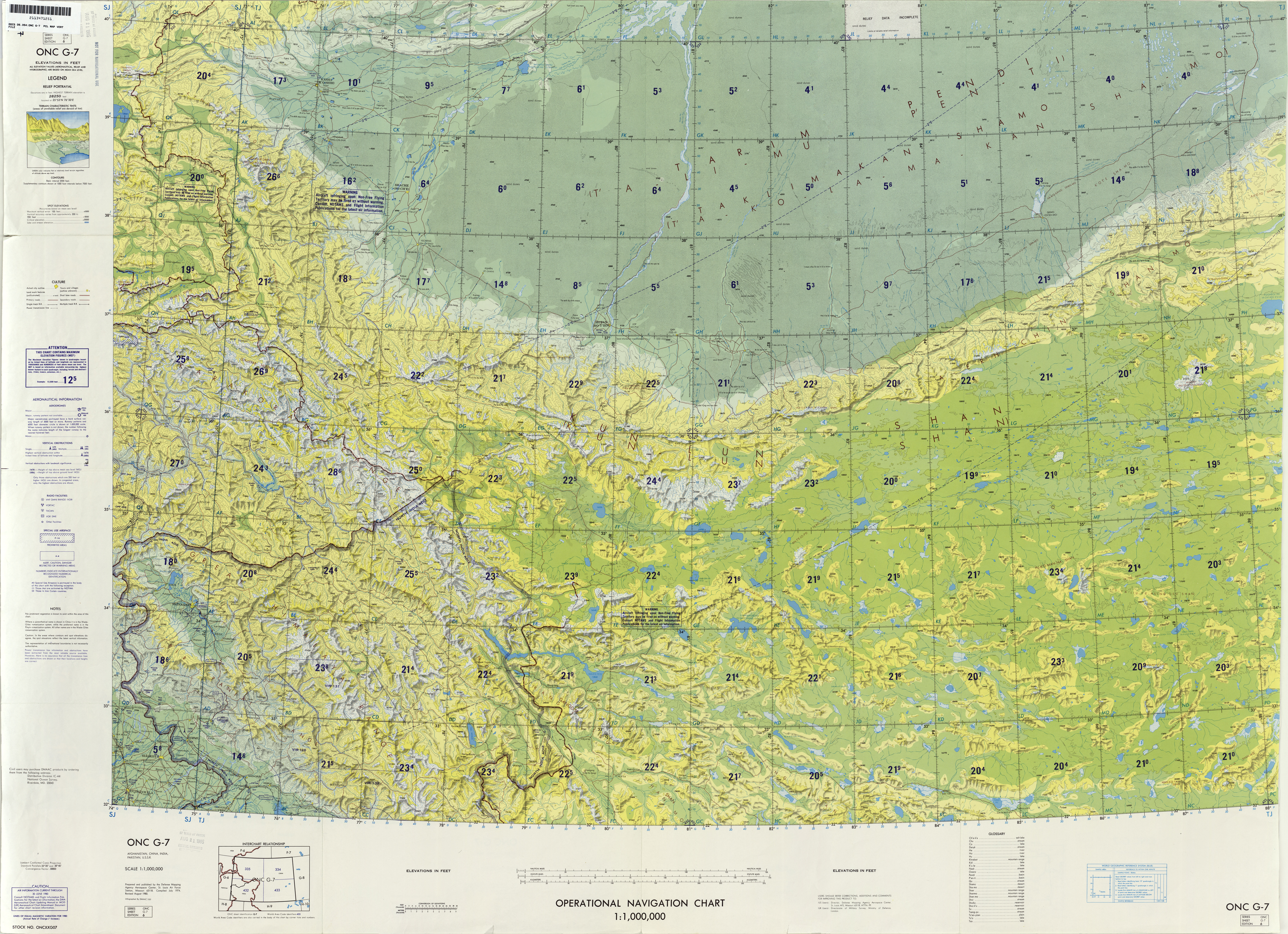
Map including Yutian (labeled as YUTIAN (YÜ-T'IEN)) and surrounding region (DMA, 1980) (Note: From map: "The representation of international boundaries is not necessarily authoritative.")
