= Oytograk =

Oytograk: ئويتوغراق يېزىسى (Uyghur); 奥依托格拉克乡 (Chinese); Aoyituo Gelake
- Township
- Location in Xinjiang Oytograk (China)
- Coordinates: 36°50′24″N 081°55′08″E
- Country: China
- Autonomous Region: Xinjiang
- Prefecture: Hotan
- County: Yutian / Keriya
- Seat: Langanwusitang (兰干吾斯塘村)
- Village-level divisions: 18

Area
  - Total: 3,639 km^{2} (1,405 sq mi)

Population (2010)
  - Total: 18,271
  - Density: 5.021/km^{2} (13.00/sq mi)

Ethnic groups
  - Major ethnic groups: Uyghur
- Time zone: UTC+8 (China Standard)

Oytograk (Uyghur: ئويتوغراق يېزىسى; Chinese: 奥依托格拉克乡) is a township in Yutian County (Keriya), Hotan Prefecture, Xinjiang, China.

== Name ==
Oytograk (ئويتوغراق) means 'desert poplar forest lowland' in Uyghur, so named because it is located in a lowland surrounded by sand dunes that has many desert poplars.

== History ==
In 1958, Zhandou Commune (战斗公社) was established.

In 1984, Zhandou Commune became Oytograk Township (奥依托拉克乡).

== Geography ==
Oytograk is located 22.4 km (13.9 mi) east of the county seat. Oytograk is on the northern side of China National Highway 315.

== Administrative divisions ==
Yeyik includes one residential community, sixteen villages, and one other area:

Residential community (Mandarin Chinese Hanyu Pinyin-derived names except where Uyghur is provided):

- Xinjiayuan (新家园社区)

Villages:

- Tawugazi (塔吾尕孜村), Taleke'airike (塔勒克艾日克村), Langanwusitang (meaning 'relay station canal' (驿站渠) in Uyghur; 兰干吾斯塘村), Ya'ermaili (亚尔买里村), Toghraq'östeng (Tuogelawusitang; توغراقئۆستەڭ كەنت / 托格拉吾斯塘村), Kule'airike (库勒艾日克村), Yesiyoulegun (Yesiyou Leguncun; 也斯尤勒滚村) 36°53′24″N 082°11′44″E, Tumuya (吐木亚村), A'erkawusitang (阿尔喀吾斯塘村), Yigeziduwei (依格孜都维村), Kalakumushi (喀拉库木什村), Afutapulekekule (阿甫塔普勒克库勒村), Bayilake (巴依拉克村), Alega (阿勒尕村), Yinake (依纳克村), Baiheti (拜合提村)

Other areas:

- Tianjin Industrial Park Administrative Area (天津工业园区管理区)

== Economy ==
Oytograk produces muskmelon, and is known for Daqingtao (大青桃). There is silkworm farming in Oytograk. Groundwater resources are plentiful.

The total area of cultivated land in Oytograk increased between 1977 and 2002.

== Demographics ==
Historical population
Year	Pop.	±% p.a.
2000	16,377	—
2010	18,271	+1.10%

As of 1997, the population of Oytograk, in total about 15,000 residents, was Uyghur.

== Transportation ==
- China National Highway 315

== Historical maps ==
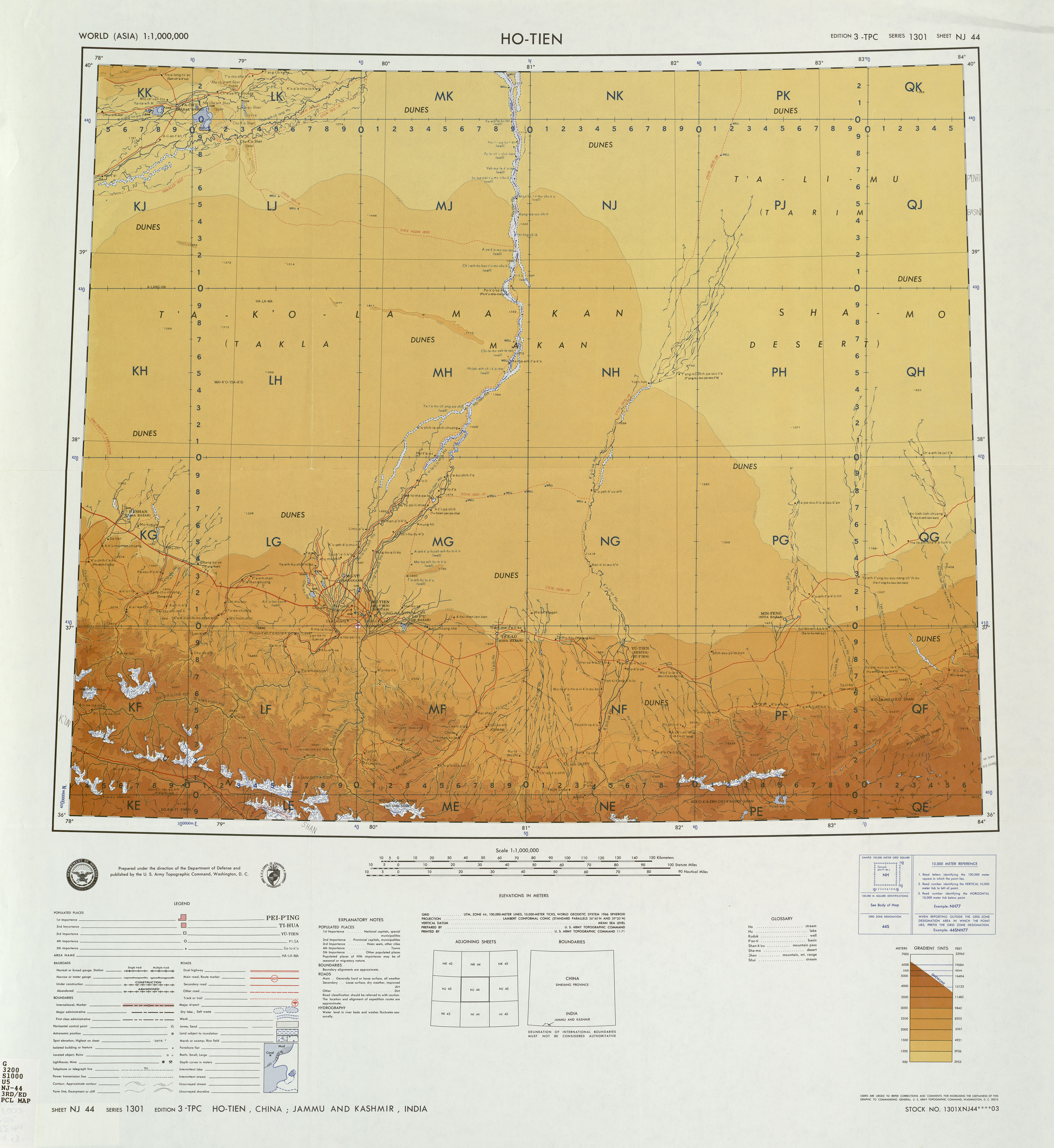
Map including Oytograk (labeled as Wo-t'o-la-k'o (Ao-i-t'o-ko-la-k'o)) and surrounding region in the International Map of the World (USATC, 1971) (Note: (from map: "DELINEATION OF INTERNATIONAL BOUNDARIES MUST NOT BE CONSIDERED AUTHORITATIVE"))

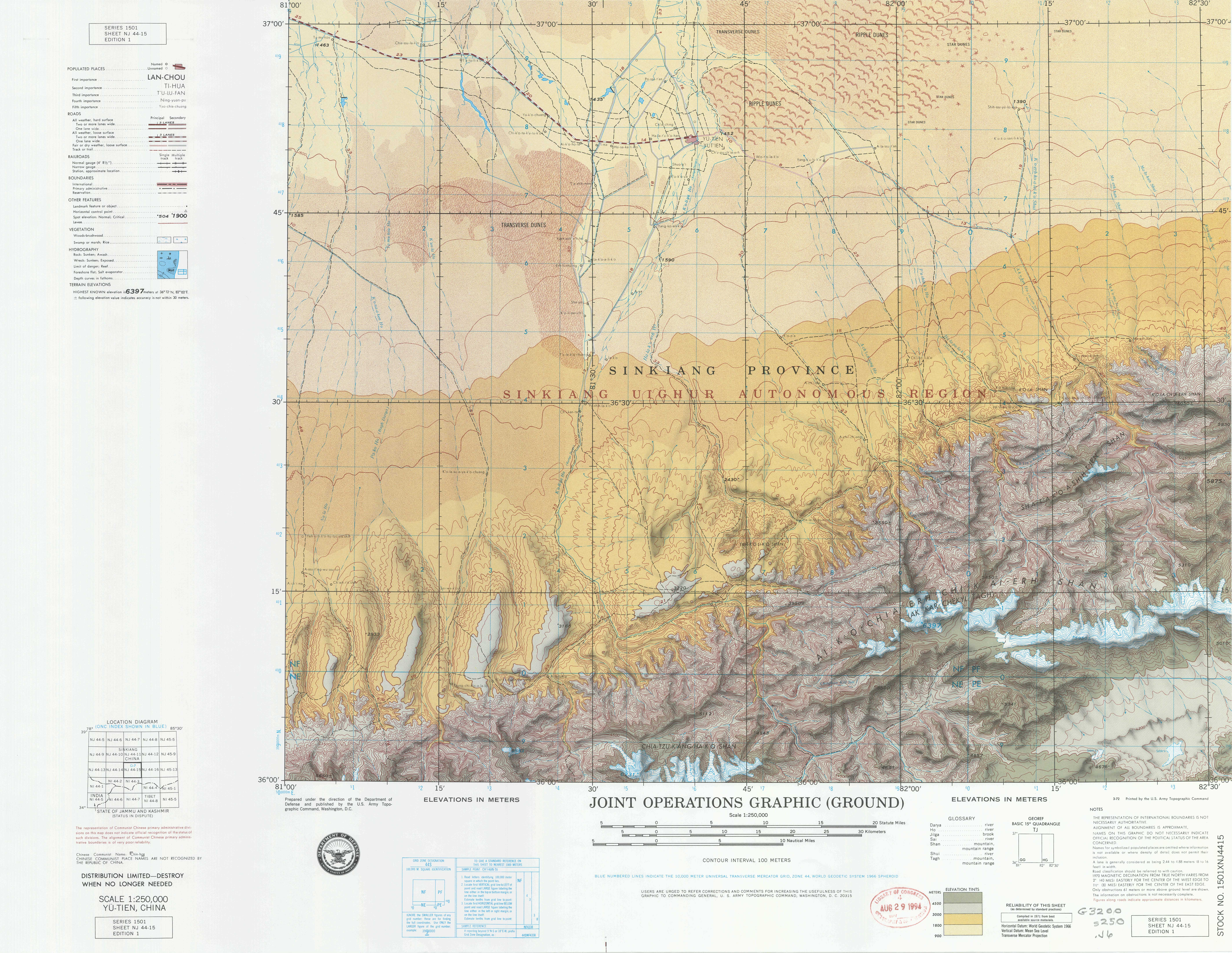
Map including Oytograk (labeled as Wo-t'o-la-k'o) (ATC, 1971)

== See also ==
- List of township-level divisions of Xinjiang
