= Kurban Tulum =

Uyghur farmer and electrician (1883–1975)

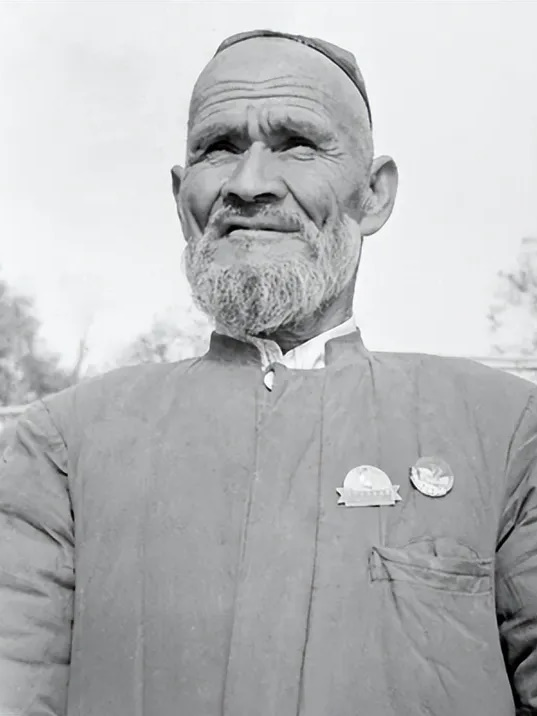
- Born: 1883; Keriya, Xinjiang, Great Qing
- Died: 26 May 1975 (aged 91–92); Hotan, Xinjiang Uyghur Autonomous Region, People's Republic of China
- Occupation(s): Farmer and electrician

Uyghur name
- Uyghur: قۇربان تۇلۇم
Transcriptions
- Latin Yëziqi: Qurban Tulum
- Yengi Yeziⱪ: Ⱪurban Tulum

Chinese name
- Simplified Chinese: 库尔班·吐鲁木
- Traditional Chinese: 庫爾班·吐魯木
Transcriptions
Standard Mandarin
- Hanyu Pinyin: Kù'ěrbān Tǔlǔmù

Chinese nickname
- Simplified Chinese: 库尔班大叔
- Traditional Chinese: 庫爾班大叔
- Literal meaning: Uncle Kurban
Transcriptions
Standard Mandarin
- Hanyu Pinyin: Kù'ěrbān dàshū

Kurban Tulum (Uyghur: قۇربان تۇلۇم; Chinese: 库尔班·吐鲁木; 1883 – 26 May 1975), also known as Uncle Kurban (库尔班大叔), was a Uyghur farmer and electrician who lived in the oasis town of Keriya, in Xinjiang, China. The government of the People's Republic of China promotes him as a symbol of ethnic unity.

== Biography ==
According to a local cadre, prior to the arrival of the Chinese Communist Party, Kurban was a serf who worked as a seasonal labourer for Uyghur landlords. During the land reforms of 1952, Kurban received land and various other properties. He is said to have visited Ürümqi, the capital of Xinjiang, by riding a donkey, to show his appreciation for the People's Liberation Army's role in liberating his area. He tried to hitchhike to Beijing, the Chinese capital, but was unsuccessful.

In May 1958, he was chosen as a member of an agricultural delegation from Xinjiang to Beijing. The delegation reached Beijing on 18 June and met with Chinese leader Mao Zedong on 28 June 1958.

He was elected as a delegate to the 2nd National People's Congress in 1959 and the 4th National People's Congress in 1975.

== Legacy ==
Monuments of Kurban's handshake with Mao stand in the town centres of Keriya and Hotan (Tuanjie Square), the birth and death places of Kurban, respectively.

A song named "Where Are You Going, Uncle Kurban?" (库尔班大叔您去哪儿?) and a film titled Uncle Kurban Visits Beijing (库尔班大叔上北京) were produced in 2002. He is a well-known figure in China as his name appears in state-produced school textbooks.

A 2019 TV series titled Uncle Kurban and His Descendants (库尔班大叔和他的子孙们) dramatised the overthrow of his landlord and his descendant's career in becoming an officer in the People's Liberation Army Navy.

== See also ==
- Propaganda in the People's Republic of China
