= Keriya Town =

Keriya
- County-level city
- Location in Xinjiang
- Coordinates: 36°51′N 81°40′E
- Country: People's Republic of China
- Autonomous region: Xinjiang
- Prefecture: Hotan
- County: Yutian/Keriya

Population (2010)
  - Total: 30,179

Ethnic groups
  - Major ethnic groups: Uyghur, Han Chinese
- Time zone: UTC+8 (China Standard)
- Postal code: 839000
- Area code: 0903
- Local languages: Uyghur, Mandarin Chinese

Keriya Town

Chinese name
- Traditional Chinese: 木尕拉鎮
- Simplified Chinese: 木尕拉镇
Transcriptions
Standard Mandarin
- Hanyu Pinyin: Mùgǎlā Zhèn
- Wade–Giles: Mu^{4}-ka^{3}-la^{1} Chen^{4}
- IPA: [mûkàlá ʈʂɤn]

Uyghur name
- Uyghur: كېرىيە
Transcriptions
- Latin Yëziqi: Këriye
- Yengi Yeziⱪ: Keriyə
- SASM/GNC: Keriya
- Siril Yëziqi: Керийə

Keriya Town or Mugala Town is a town in Yutian (Keriya) County, Hotan Prefecture, Xinjiang, China, on the old Southern Silk Road. As the commercial and administrative centre of Keriya County, it is about 166 km east of Hotan, 80 km east of Qira, and 120 km west of Niya. Yutian County has a population of about 160,000.

== History ==
The small modern town of Keriya is situated on the western bank of the Keriya River. Approximately 180 km north along the Keriya River is the ancient fortified site of Karadong, where the world's oldest Buddhist murals have been found. It was abandoned in the 4th century CE. Another site, Yuan Sha, some 40 km north of Karadong, dates from the Iron Age but was abandoned by about 130 BCE.

There is a village about 75 km south of Keriya called Pulu. There are a number of peaks over 6,000 metres to the south of the oasis, including Qong Muztag at 6,962 m (22,841 ft) in the upper Keriya River Valley. About 100 families of the distinctive Keriya Uyghurs, who are said to be quite distinct from other Uyghurs, live at Tangzubasti Village, about 170 km north of the town of Yutian. It is said to be on the ruins of the ancient city of Keladun where artifacts from the Han Dynasty (206 BCE – 222 CE) have been found.

Marco Polo visited the oasis in the late 13th century. He described it as being five days' journey in extent, but with sandy deserts to both east and west. Both the province and the capital city were called Pem or Peyn. He noted that the people were Muslims, and that there were many towns and villages. He indicated that there were plenty of products there, including cotton. He also mentions that "jasper" (probably nephrite jade) and chalcedony were found in the rivers and the people "live by manufacture and trade". He also wrote of their custom: "...if a married man goes to a distance from home to be absent twenty days, his wife has a right, if she is inclined, to take another husband; and the men, on the same principle, marry wherever they happen to reside."

Gold mines were reported near Keriya in the 19th century.

In 2013, Xingfu and Hexie were listed as residential communities in the town.

In 2017, eight residential communities and seven villages were added to those listed as part of the town.

== Administrative divisions ==
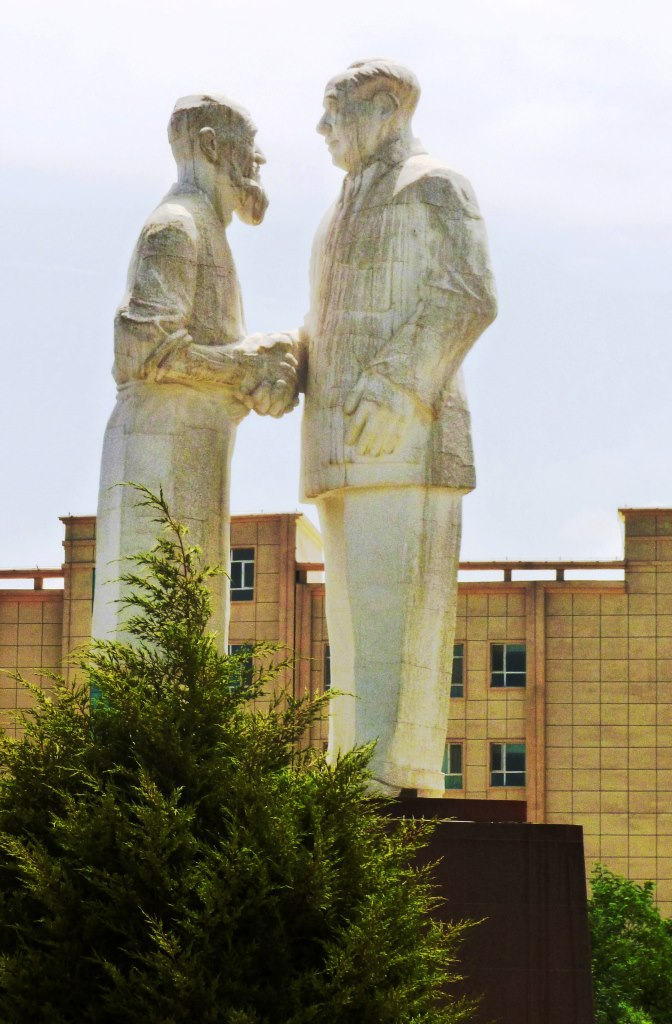
Statue of Kurban Tulum and Mao Zedong in downtown Keriya.

As of 2018, the town was made up of eighteen residential communities and twenty-four villages.

Residential communities (Mandarin Chinese Hanyu Pinyin-derived names):

- Kunlun (昆仑社区), Jiande (建德社区), Tuanjie (团结社区), Yucheng (玉城社区), Wusitangbeixi/Wusitangbashi (吾斯塘贝希社区/吾斯塘巴什社区), Aitika (艾提卡社区/艾提喀社区), Tanaibeixi/Tanaiyibeixi (塔乃贝希社区/塔乃依贝希社区), Dunbage (墩巴格社区), Xingfu (幸福社区), Hexie (和谐社区), Tianmei (阗美社区), Tianyuan (阗园社区), Chaoyang (朝阳社区), Guangming (光明社区), Kuaile (快乐社区), Guzai (古再社区), Meigui (玫瑰社区), Kutazibeixi (库塔孜贝希社区)

Villages:

- Guzai (古再村), Aremukamu (阿热木喀木村), Mugakulebeixi/Mugakulebashi (木尕库勒贝希村/木尕库勒巴什村), Kaga (喀尕村/卡尕村), Ale (阿勒村), Tugemankuoqia (吐格曼阔恰村), Andaikulebeixi/Andaikulebashi (安代库勒贝希村/安代库勒巴什村), Mugala (木尕拉村), Bashikaqun (巴什喀群村), Ayagekaqun/Ayakekaqun (阿亚格喀群村/阿亚克喀群村), Yingqikai'airike/Yingqige'aireke (英其开艾日克村/英其格艾热克村), Kariman (喀日曼村), Asiting'aoyi/Asitingwuyi (阿斯廷奥依村/阿斯廷乌依村), Wusitangwuqi (吾斯塘吾其村), Kongkamazha (空喀麻扎村), Kukairen (库开仁村), Bositan (博斯坦村), Lüzhou (绿洲村), Taoyuan (桃园村), Youyi (友谊村), Akeyilaike (阿克依来克村), Maidiniyeti (买迪尼也提村), Yitipake (依提帕克村), Keliya (克里雅村)

In 2009, residential communities and villages in the town were:

Residential communities (Mandarin Chinese Hanyu Pinyin-derived names):

- Kunlun (昆仑社区), Jiande (建德社区), Tuanjie (团结社区), Yucheng (玉城社区), Wusitangbeixi (吾斯塘贝希社区), Aitika (艾提卡社区), Tanaibeixi (塔乃贝希社区), Dunbage (墩巴格社区)

Villages:

- Guzai (古再村), Aremukamu (阿热木喀木村), Mugakulebeixi (木尕库勒贝希村), Kaga (喀尕村), Ale (阿勒村), Tugemankuoqia (吐格曼阔恰村), Andaikulebeixi (安代库勒贝希村), Mugala (木尕拉村), Bashikaqun (巴什喀群村), Ayagekaqun (阿亚格喀群村), Yingqikai'airike (英其开艾日克村), Kariman (喀日曼村), Asiting'aoyi (阿斯廷奥依村), Wusitangwuqi (吾斯塘吾其村), Kongkamazha (空喀麻扎村), Kukairen (库开仁村), Bositan (博斯坦村)

== Transportation ==
- China National Highway 315

== See also ==
- List of township-level divisions of Xinjiang
