= Keriya River =

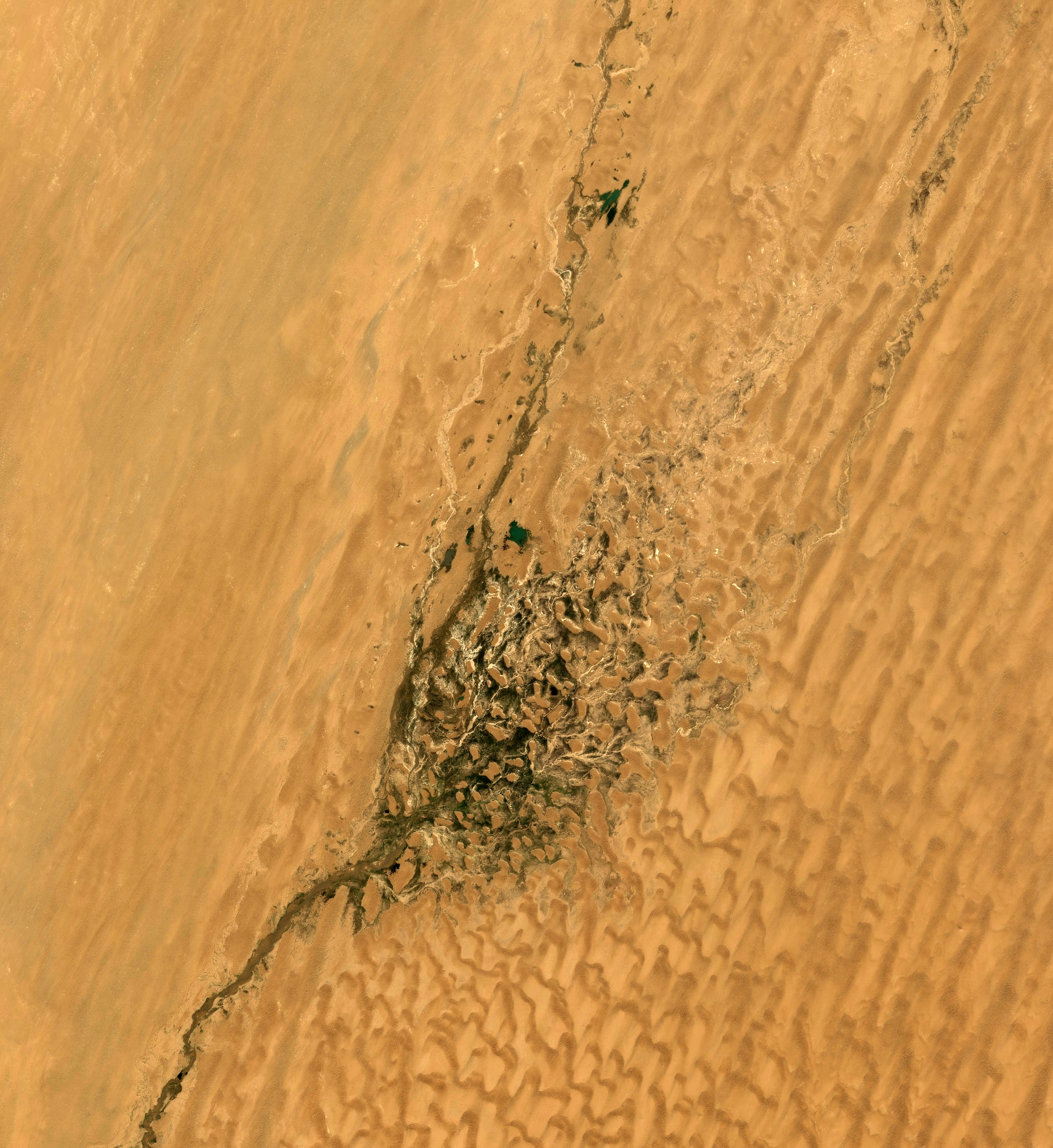

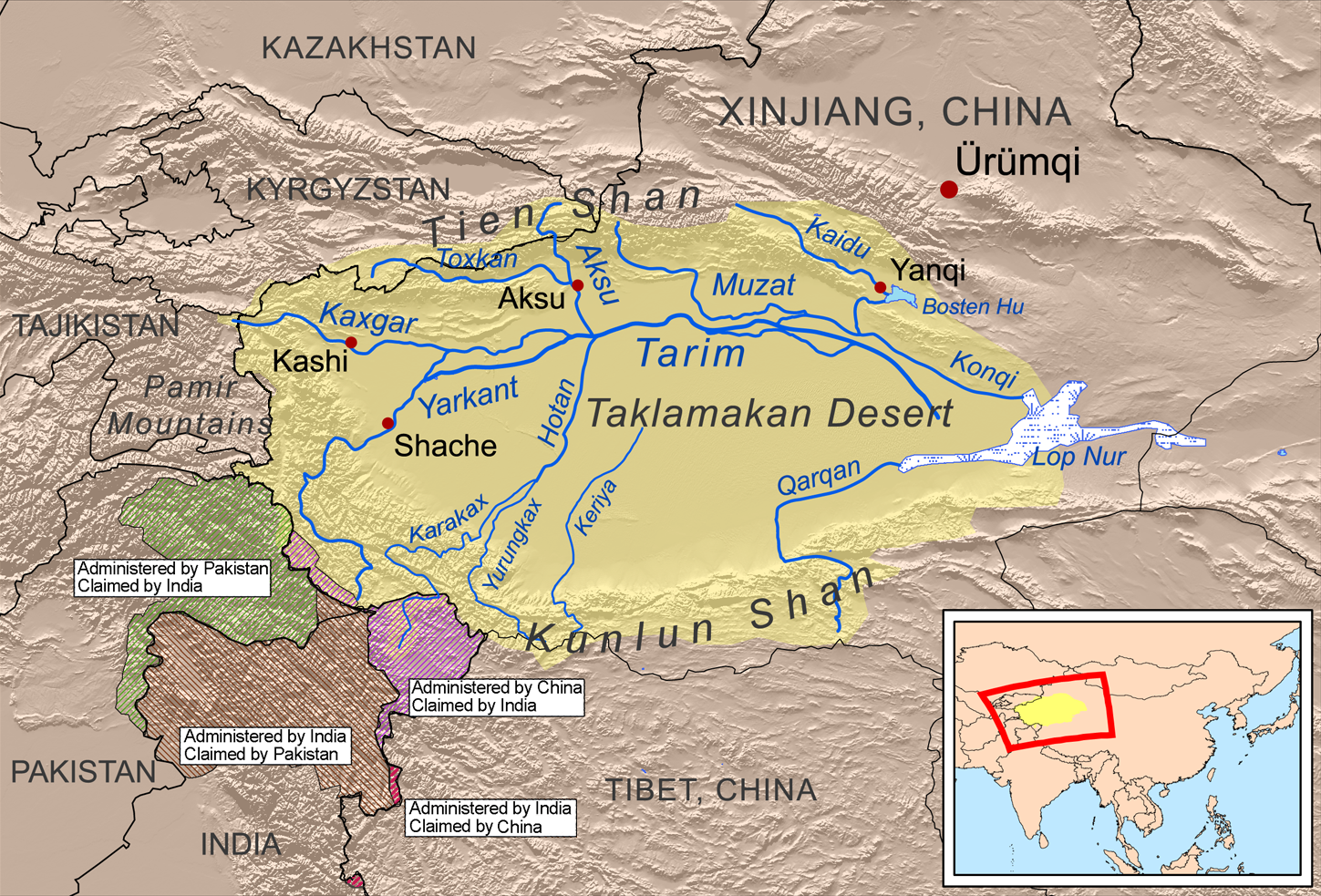
- Map of the Tarim Basin including the Keriya River

Location
- Country: China
- State: Xinjiang

Physical characteristics
- Source: Kunlun Shan
  - coordinates: 35°38′31″N 82°43′30″E
  - elevation: 5,610 m (18,410 ft)
- Mouth: Tarim Basin
  - coordinates: 38°36′11″N 82°05′48″E
  - elevation: 1,150 m (3,770 ft)
- Length: 519 km (322 mi)
- Basin size: 7,358 km^{2} (2,841 sq mi)
- Discharge
  - location: Keriya Town
  - average: 22.6 m^{3}/s (800 cu ft/s)
  - minimum: 0 m^{3}/s (0 cu ft/s)
  - maximum: 780 m^{3}/s (28,000 cu ft/s)

The Keriya River is a river in the province of Xinjiang in China. It flows for 519 km (322 mi) from the Kunlun Shan mountain range north into the endorheic Tarim Basin, but is lost in the desert several hundred kilometers south of the Tarim River. The only major settlement along the river is Keriya Town, east of Hotan. The river is an important source of irrigation water and also supplies historically important oases along its course. Its drainage basin covers about 7,358 km^{2} (2,841 mi^{2}).

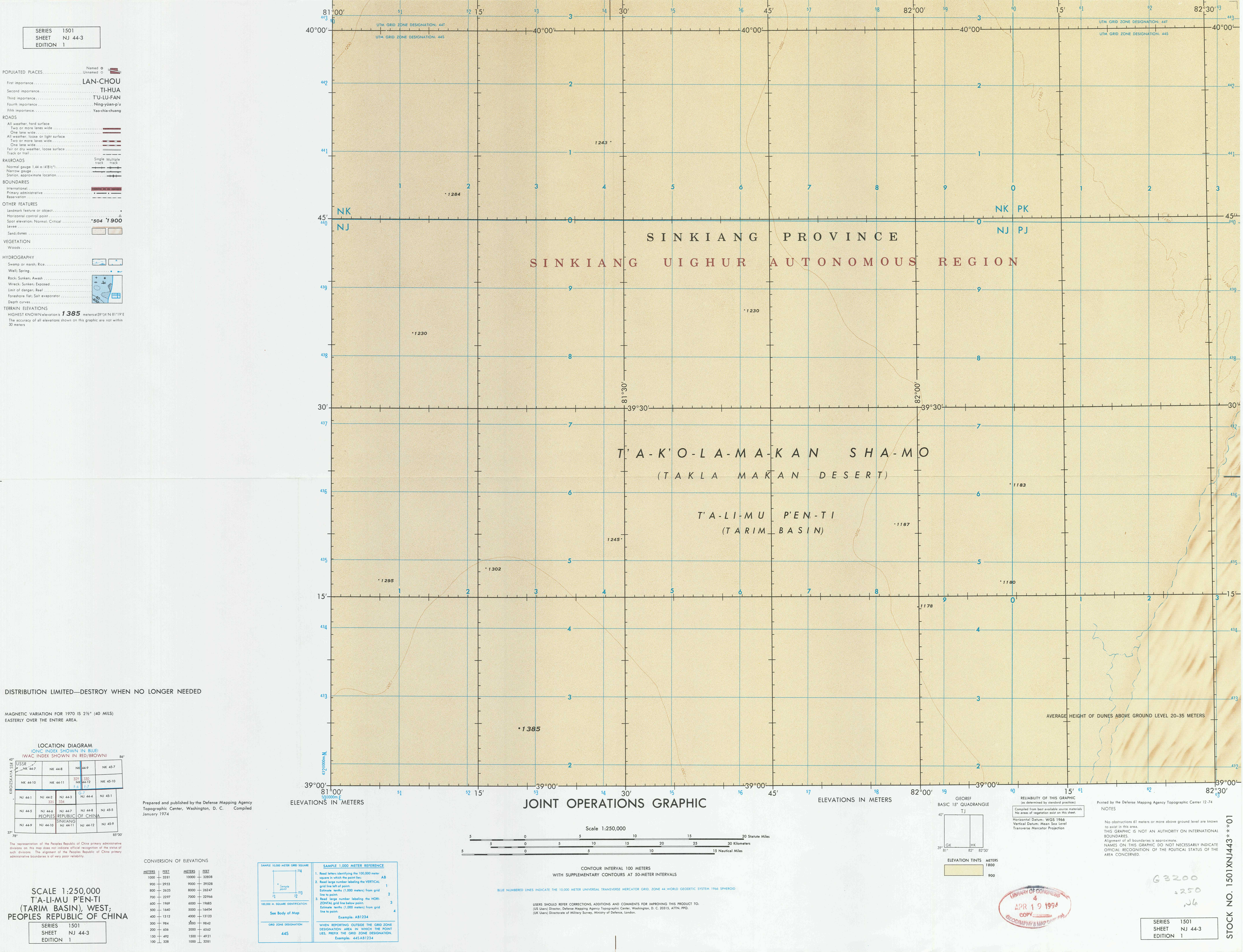
Map including a section of the Keriya River in the Taklamakan Desert (DMA, 1974)

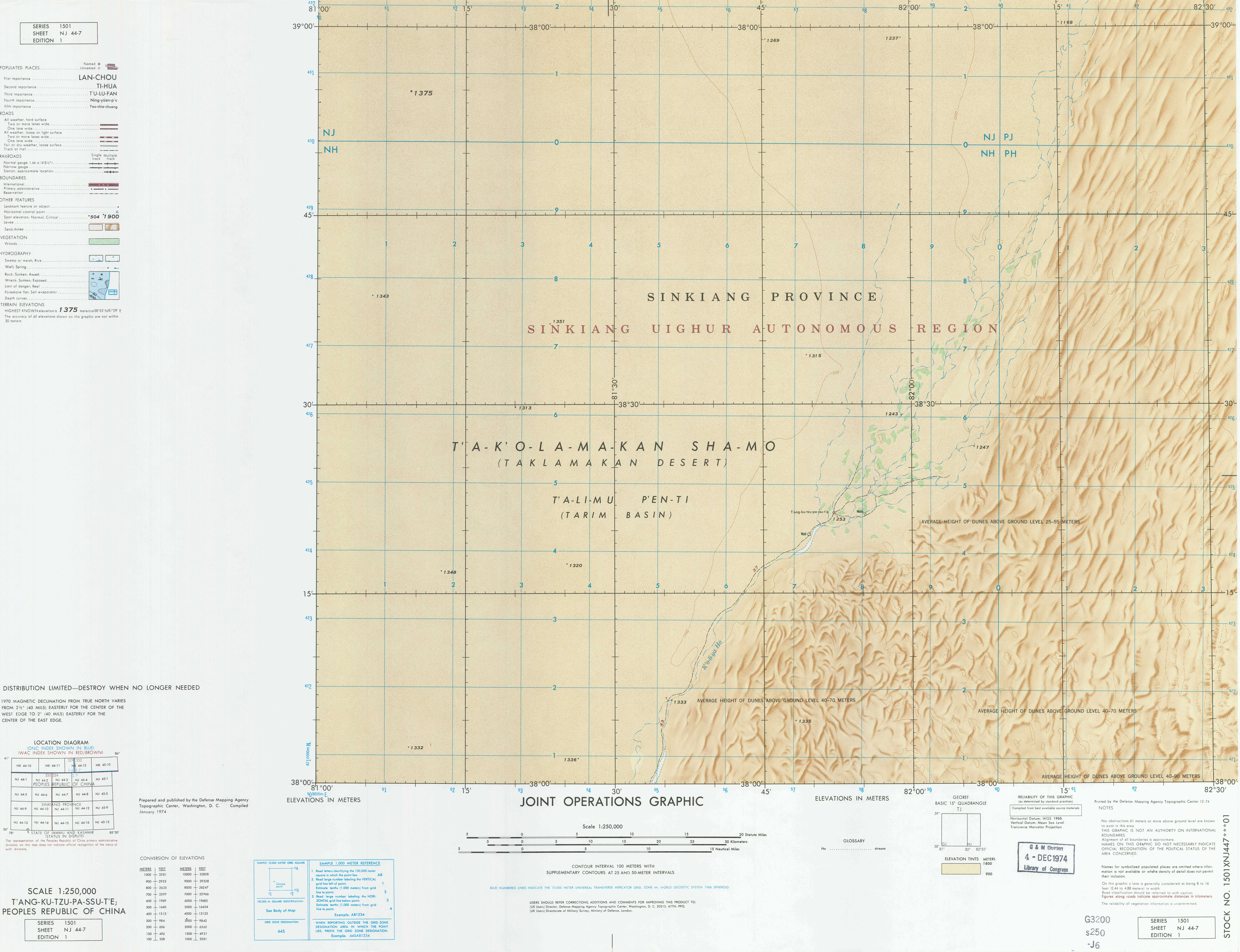
Map including a section of the Keriya River (labeled as K'o-li-ya Ho) in the Taklamakan Desert (DMA, 1974)

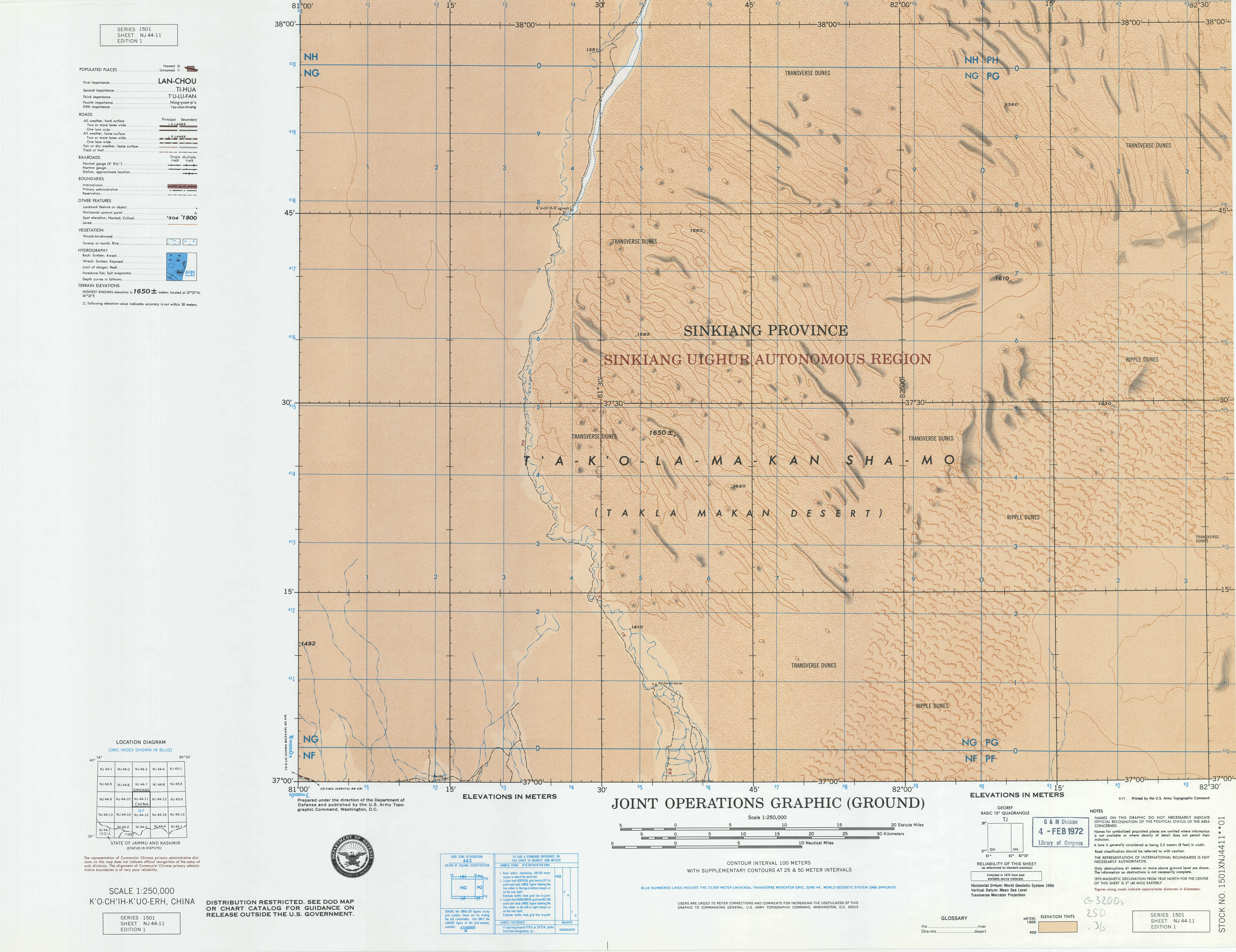
Map including a section of the Keriya River (labeled as K'o-li-ya Ho) in the Taklamakan Desert (ATC, 1970)

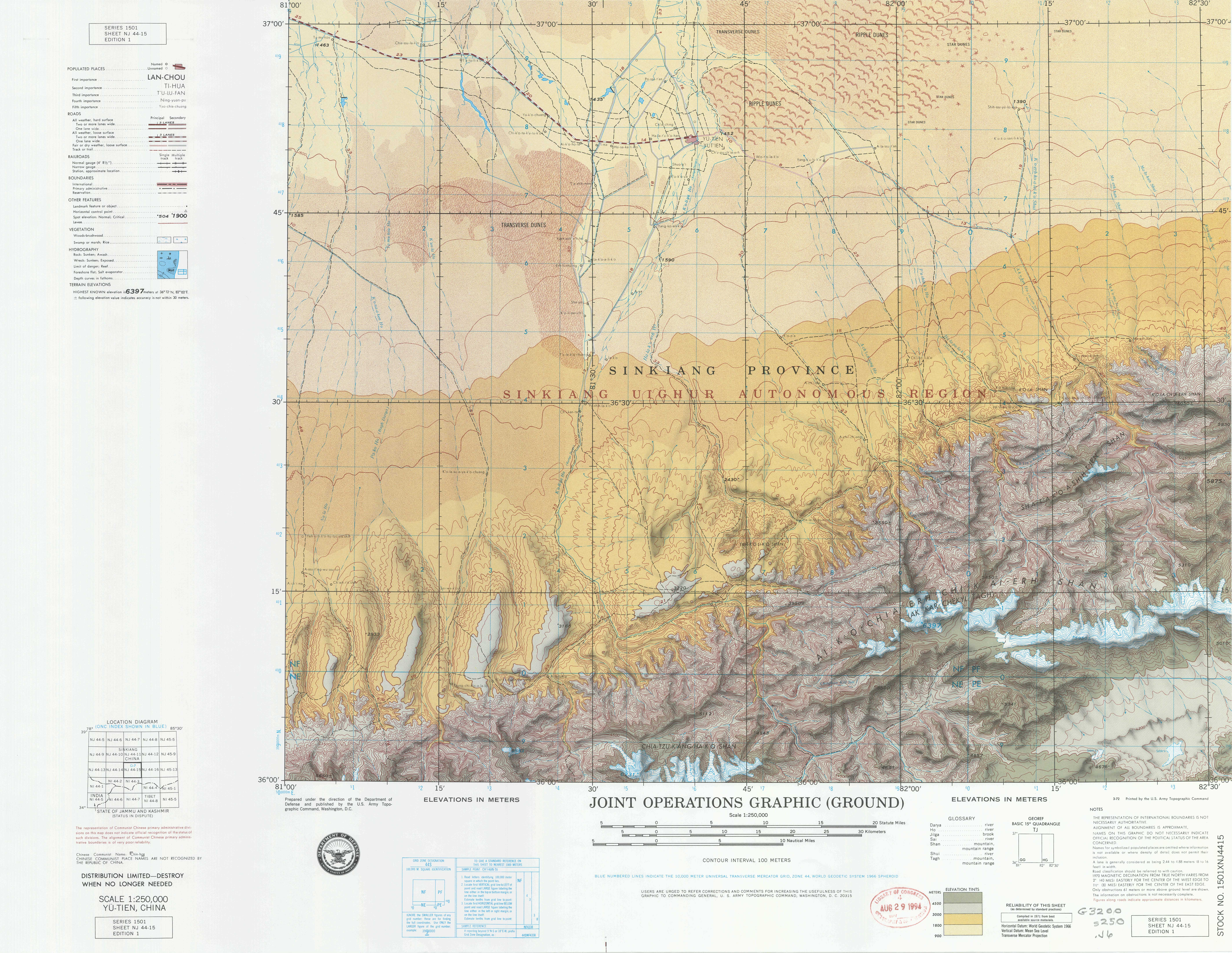
Map including a section of the Keriya River (labeled as K'o-li-ya Ho (Keryia Daryo)) in the Taklamakan Desert (ATC, 1971)

Situated in an extremely arid region, the river is heavily dependent on glacier meltwater, which provides about 71% of its flow. Some 20% comes from groundwater seepage, and only 9% comes from direct precipitation. Historical accounts suggest that the river may have reached the Tarim as recently as 200 B.C, when the climate in the area was wetter and much less water was being used by human activities.

== See also ==
- Karakash River
- Khotan River
- List of rivers of China
- Yurungkash River
