= Hotan River =

River in northern China

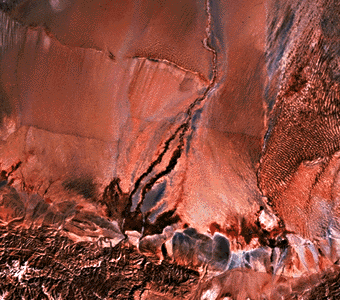
- Aerial view of the Hotan River
- Native name: خوتەن دەرياسى (Uyghur); 和田河 (Chinese)

Physical characteristics
- Source: Karakash River, White Jade River
  - coordinates: 38.08°N 80.56°E
- Mouth: Tarim River
  - coordinates: 40.478479°N 80.944169°E

Basin features
- Progression: Tarim→ Taitema Lake

Hotan River

Uyghur name
- Uyghur: خوتەن دەرياسى
Transcriptions
- Latin Yëziqi: Xoten deryasi
- Yengi Yeziⱪ: Hotən dəryasi
- Siril Yëziqi: Хоtəн дәряси

Chinese name
- Chinese: 和田河
Transcriptions
Standard Mandarin
- Hanyu Pinyin: Hétián Hé
- Wade–Giles: He^{2}-t'ien^{2} He^{2}

Old name
- Traditional Chinese: 和闐河
- Simplified Chinese: 和阗河
Transcriptions
Standard Mandarin
- Hanyu Pinyin: Hétián Hé
- Wade–Giles: He^{2}-t'ien^{2} He^{2}

The Hotan River (also known as the Khotan River or the Ho-t'ien River) is formed by the union of the White Jade (Yurungkash) and Karakash (Black Jade) Rivers, which flow north from the Kunlun Mountains into the Taklamakan Desert in northern China. The two rivers unite towards the middle of the desert, some 145 kilometres (90 mi) north of the town of Hotan. The river then flows 290 kilometres (180 mi) northwards across the desert and empties itself into the Tarim River. Because the river is fed by melting snow from the mountains, it only carries water during the summer and is dry the rest of the year. Prior to construction of the Tarim Desert Highway in 1995, the Hotan river bed provided the only transportation system across the Tarim Basin.

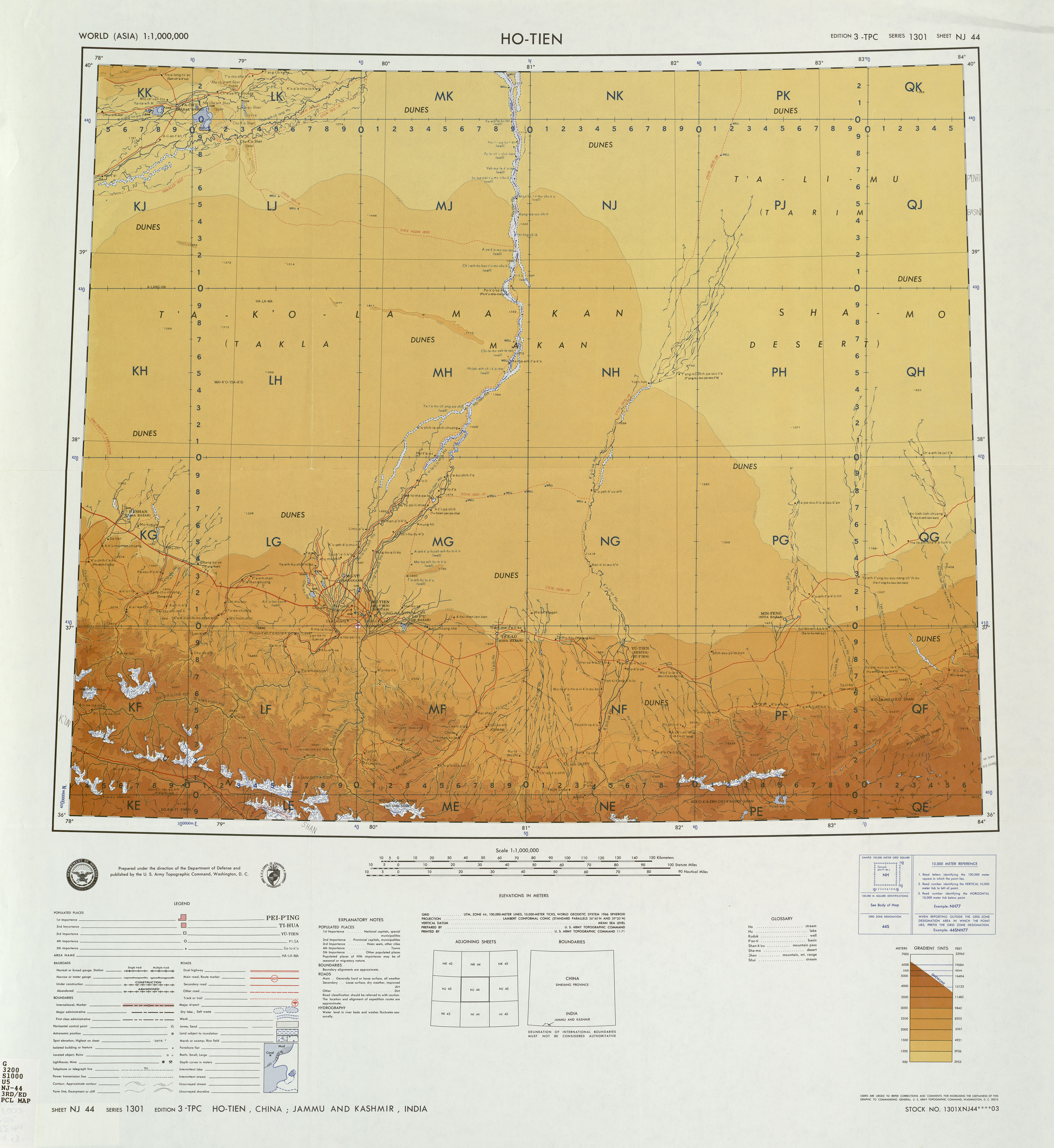
Map including the Hotan River (labeled as Ho-tien Ho) and surrounding region (USATC, 1971) (Note: From map: "DELINEATION OF INTERNATIONAL BOUNDARIES MUST NOT BE CONSIDERED AUTHORITATIVE".)

== Wells ==
In the mid-20th century, wells along the course of the river included (south to north): Hsüeh-erh-ch'i-k'o-ma, Chi-la-mu-yeh-te-tao, Ai-k'o-t'i-ken, Ch'i-erh-ko-han-t'u-mu-shu-k'o, A-ya-k'o-wu-ssu-tan, Man-ta-t'u-mu-shu-k'o, Lo-tsa-pai-t'u-mu-shu-k'o, Yeh-ma-la-k'o-tao, Po-lo-ch'u-shih-kan, Hsi-t'i-pa-ku-t'an and Ya-erh-te-ku-tzu.
