= White Jade River =

Yurungkash River White Jade River, Baiyu River
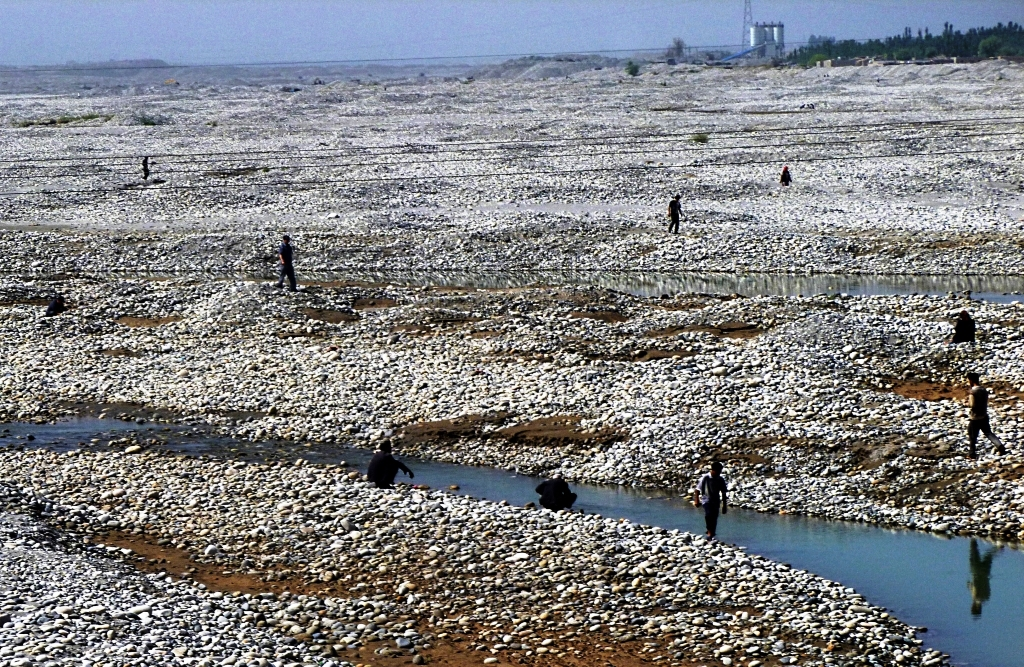
- Collecting jade in the White Jade River near Khotan in 2011
- Native name: يورۇڭقاش دەرياسى (Uyghur); 玉龙喀什河 (Chinese)

Physical characteristics
- Source: Kunlun Mountains
  - coordinates: 35.527297°N 81.495070°E
- Mouth: Hotan River
  - coordinates: 38.081296°N 80.562477°E
- Basin size: 14,575 km^{2} (5,627 mi^{2})
- Discharge
  - average: 72.3 cubic metres per second (2,550 cu ft/s)

Basin features
- Progression: Hotan→ Tarim→ Taitema Lake

White Jade River

Uyghur name
- Uyghur: يورۇڭقاش دەرياسى
Transcriptions
- Latin Yëziqi: Yorungqash deryasi
- Yengi Yeziⱪ: Yorungⱪax dəryasi
- Siril Yëziqi: Йоруңқаш дәряси

Chinese name
- Traditional Chinese: 玉龍喀什河
- Simplified Chinese: 玉龙喀什河
Transcriptions
Standard Mandarin
- Hanyu Pinyin: yùlóng kāshí hé

Alternative Chinese name
- Chinese: 白玉河
Transcriptions
Standard Mandarin
- Hanyu Pinyin: báiyù Hé
- Wade–Giles: Pai^{2}-yü^{4} Ho^{2}
- IPA: [pǎɪŷ xɤ̌]

The White Jade River is a river in southern Xinjiang, China.

The head waters of the river rise in the Kunlun Mountains, in the area of Aksai Chin in Kashmir in the Togatax area (35.6°N 81.4°E). The river flows west for some 200 km and then north for another 200 km before passing through Khotan, China (37.11°N 79.97°E). In Khotan, the river has yielded white river rocks which are also known as nephrite jade.

North of Khotan, it eventually dries up in the Taklamakan Desert, its seasonal bed joined by that of the Black Jade River (Karakash River) near Koxlax (some 200 km north of Khotan, 38.08°N 80.56°E), from where it continues north as the Hotan River, which flows into the Tarim River. The river drains an area of 14,575 km^{2} (5,627 mi^{2}) and has a discharge of 72.3 cubic metres per second (2,550 cu ft/s).

== Roads ==
- China local highway S216 follows the river from Khotan to 36.5°N 79.9°E.
- Keriyadavan Road from Akqik (some segments under construction) crosses Kunlun mountains and follows the river from 35.9°N 80.6°E to 35.8°N 80.9°E.

== Gallery ==
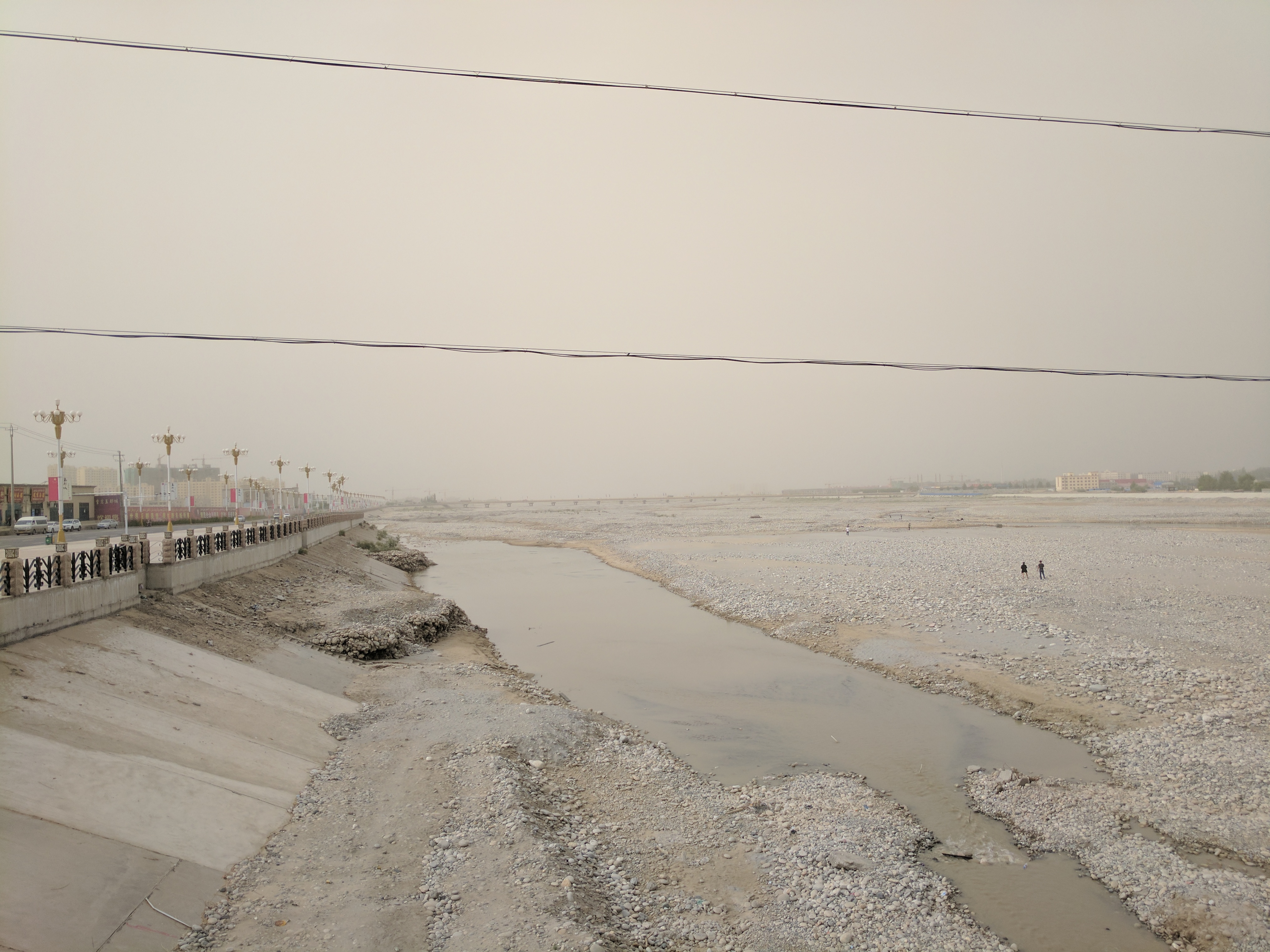
Yurungkash River near Hotan (2017).

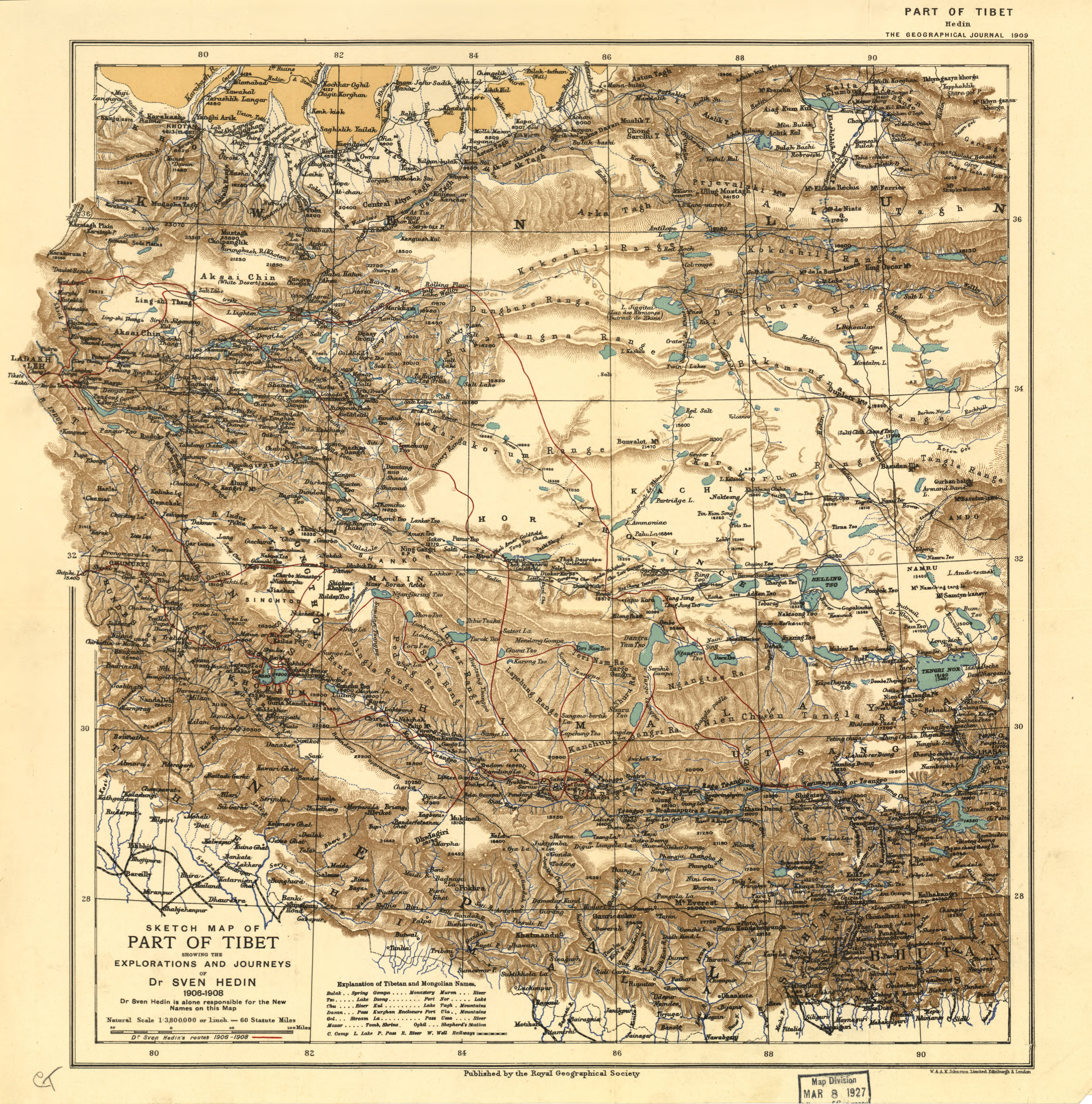
Map including White Jade River (labelled as Yurungkash R (Khotan)) (RGS, early 20th century)

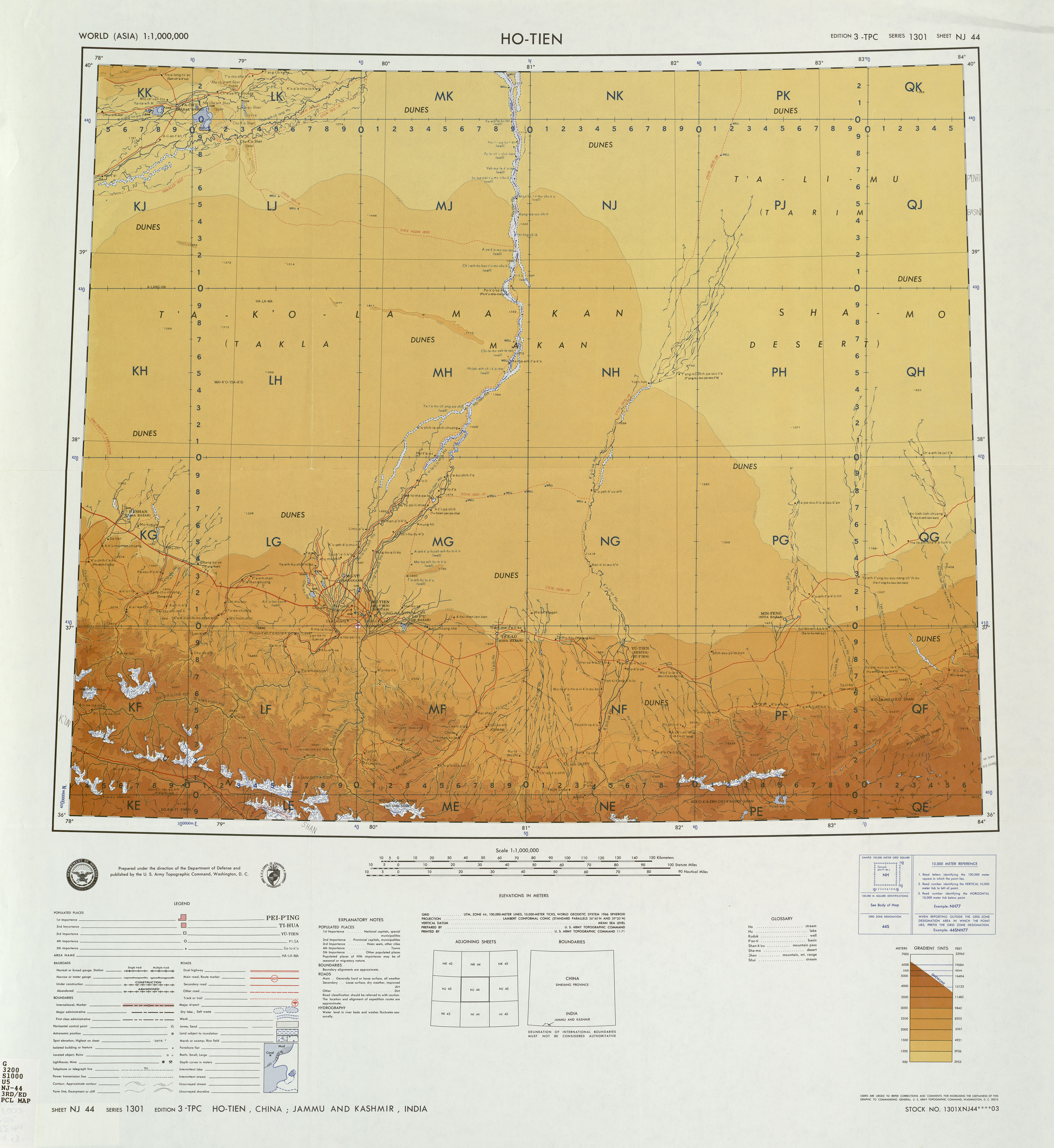
Map including the northern section of the White Jade River (labeled as Yü-lung-ha-shih Ho) and surrounding region (USATC, 1971) (Note: From map: "DELINEATION OF INTERNATIONAL BOUNDARIES MUST NOT BE CONSIDERED AUTHORITATIVE".)

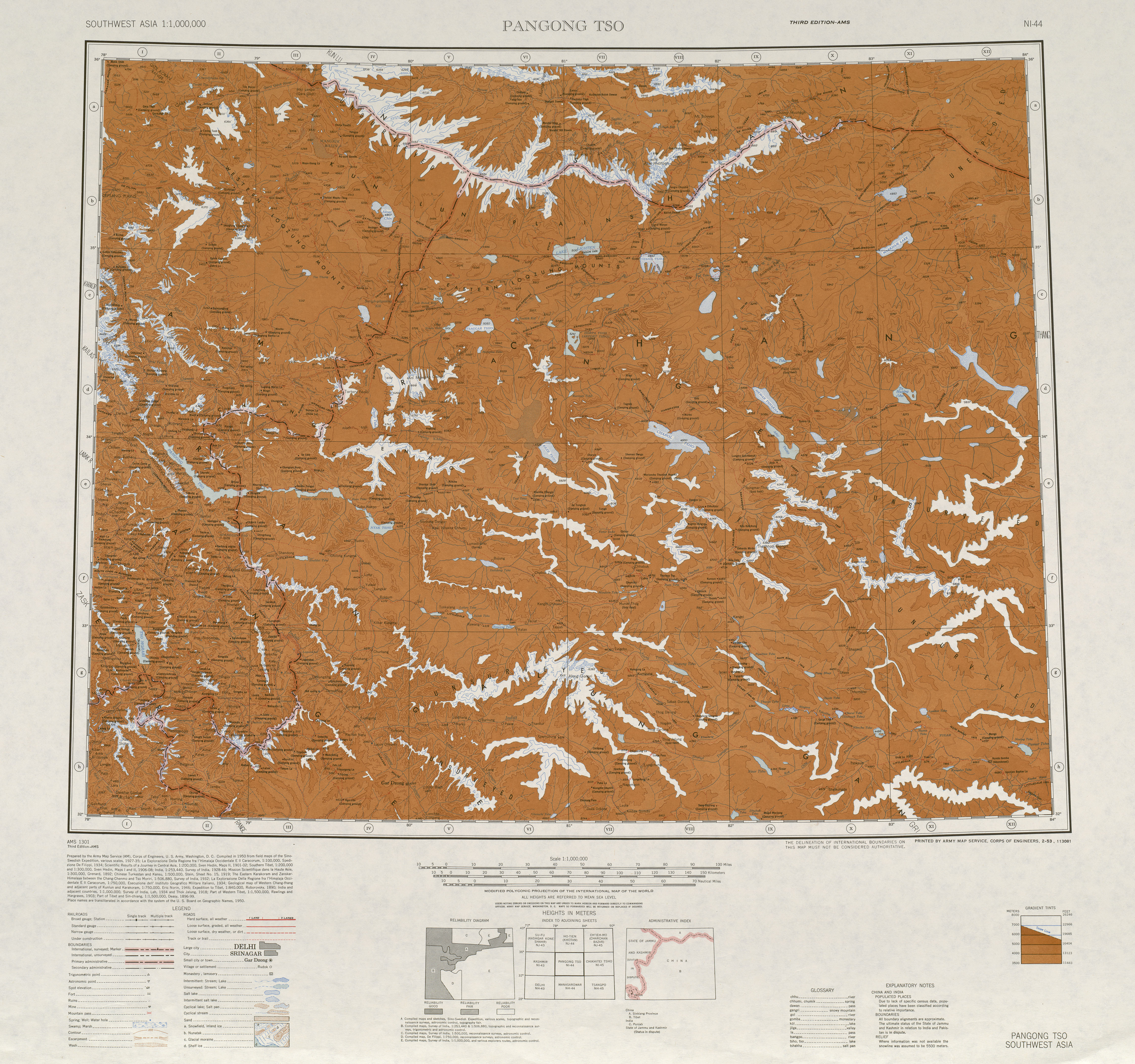
Map including the southern section of the White Jade River (labeled as Yurung Kash) and surrounding region (AMS, 1950) (Note: From map: "THE DELINEATION OF INTERNATIONAL BOUNDARIES ON THIS MAP MUST NOT BE CONSIDERED AUTHORITATIVE.")

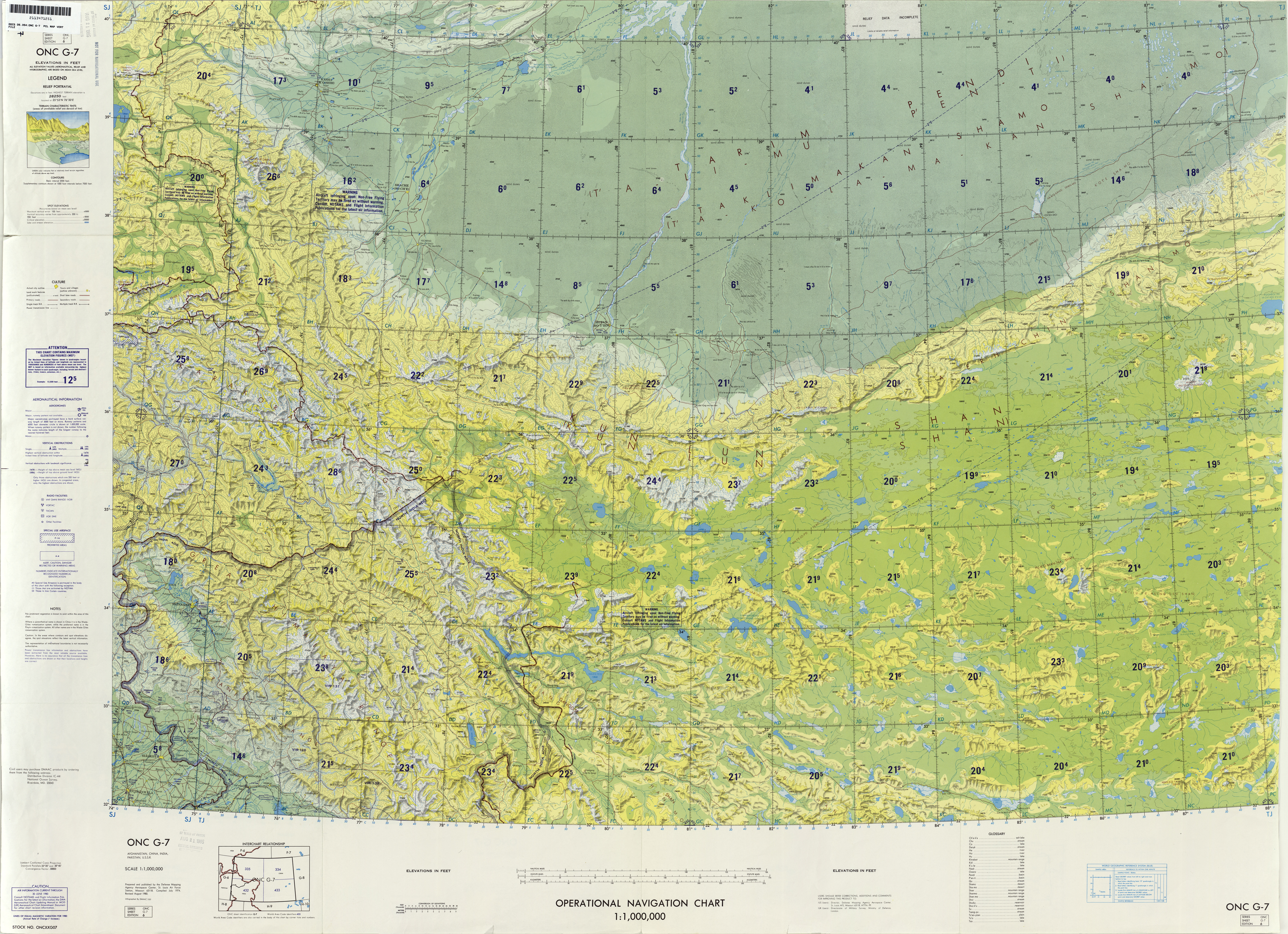
Map including the White Jade River (labeled as Ywungkax He (Yü-lung-k'o-shih Ho)) and surrounding region) (DMA, 1980) (Note: From map: "The representation of international boundaries is not necessarily authoritative.")

== See also ==
- List of rivers of China
