= Karakash River =

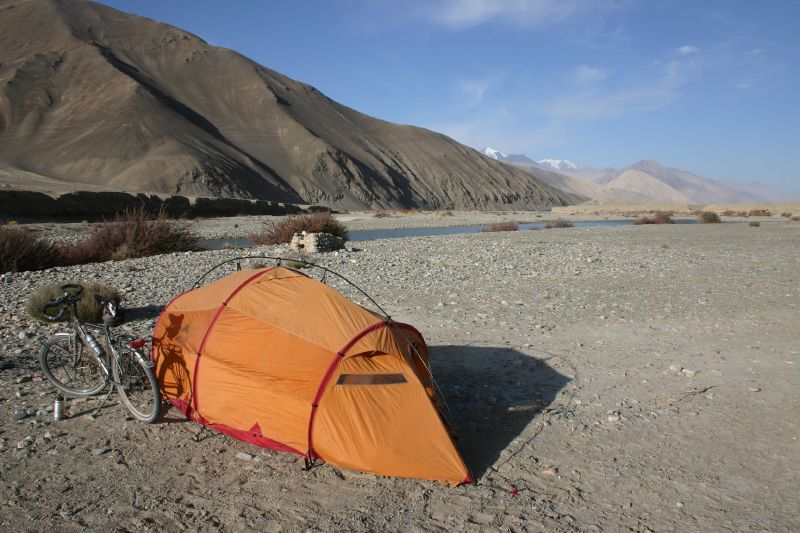

- Location of the confluence with the Yurungkash River

Location
- Country: China
- Autonomous region: Xinjiang

Physical characteristics
- Source: Karakoram range
  - location: Aksai Chin
  - coordinates: 34.9073°N 78.4727°E
  - elevation: 19,000 feet (5,800 m)
- Mouth
  - location: Hotan River
  - coordinates: 38.0858°N 80.5613°E
- Length: 740 km (460 mi)
- Basin size: 19,983 km^{2} (7,715 mi^{2})
- Discharge
  - average: 69.7 m^{3}/s (2,460 cu ft/s)

Basin features
- Progression: Hotan→ Tarim→ Taitema Lake
- Landmarks: Xaidulla, Hotan

The Karakash River (Chinese: 喀拉喀什河; pinyin: Kālākāshí Hé; Uyghur: قاراقاش دەرياسى, romanized: Qaraqash Deryasi, cyrillized: Қарақаш Дәряси) or the Black Jade River is a river in the Xinjiang autonomous region of the People's Republic of China that originates in Aksai Chin. It passes through the historical settlement of Shahidulla and passes by the city of Hotan to flow northeast in the Tarim Basin. It merges with the Yurungkash River, the combined river taking the name Hotan River and flowing into the Tarim River.

== Course ==
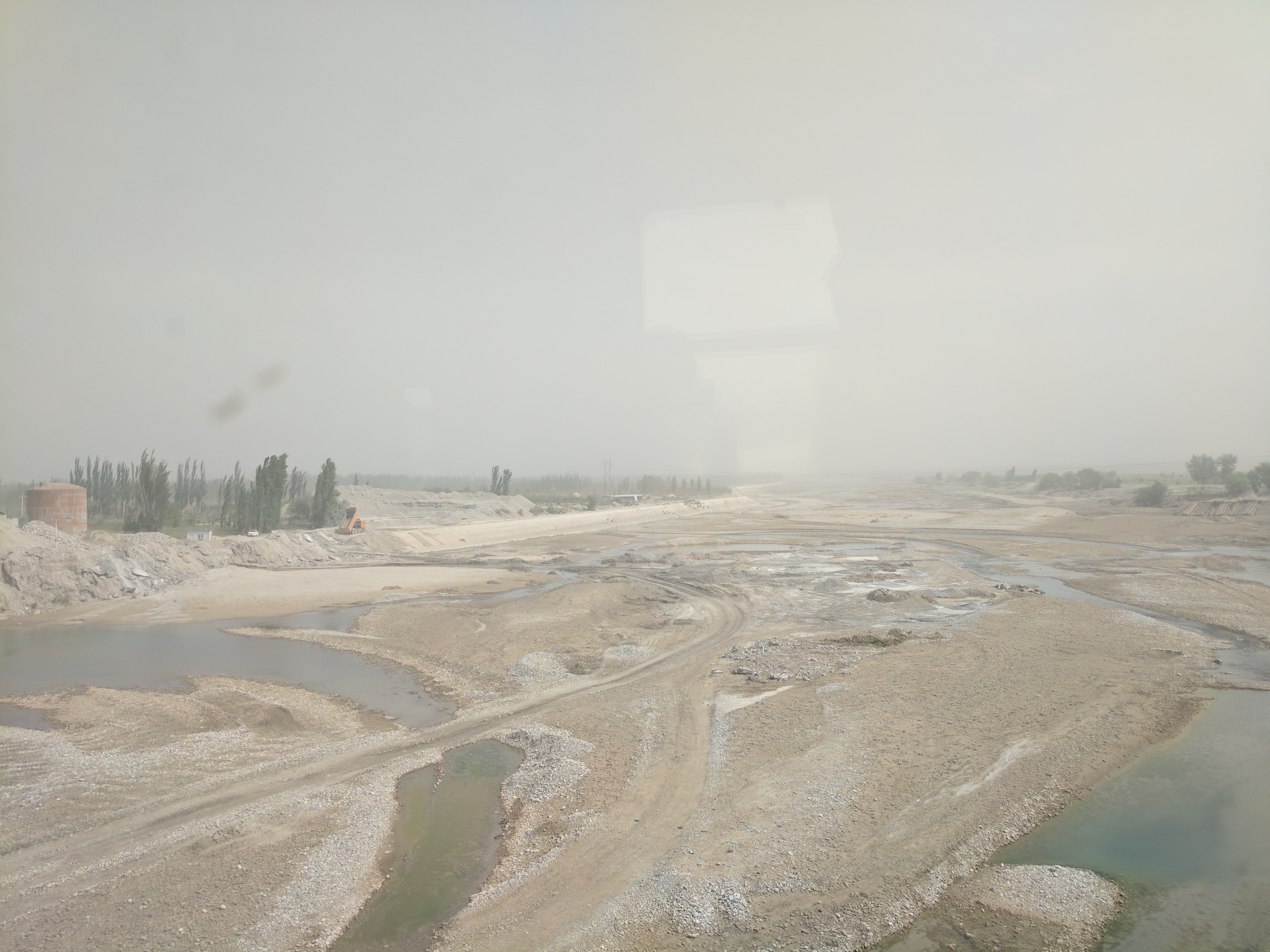
Karakash river during dry season as seen from Kashgar-Hotan railway

The river begins above 19,000 feet (5,800 m) about 7 miles (11 km) northeast of Galwan Kangri peak in Aksai Chin. It flows north to Sumnal (15,540 ft), then turns sharply eastwards, flowing at the foot of the Karatagh Range (skirting just north of the Soda Plains of Aksai Chin). Just beyond Palong Karpo, it reaches the foot of the Kunlun Mountains, where it turns sharply northwestwards, and crosses into Xinjiang proper. At this location it receives another headwater now called the 'East Karakash River' (which was once regarded as the main headwater). The combined river flows past the towns of Sumgal, Fotash, Gulbashem, until it reaches Xaidulla (Shahidulla).

The river then turns sharply northeastwards near Xaidulla, and, after passing through Ali Nazar cuts through the Kunlun mountain range near the Suget or Sanju Pass. It passes by Khotan to its west, running parallel to the Yurungkash River, which it joins near Koxlax (some 125 km north of Khotan (38.08°N 80.56°E). The combined river is called the Hotan River, which flows into the Tarim River.

== History ==
The Karakash River is famous for its white and greenish jade (nephrite) carried as river boulders and pebbles toward Khotan, as does the nearby Yurungkash (or 'White Jade') River. This river jade originates from eroded mountain deposits of which the most famous one is near Gulbashen, in southwestern Xinjiang (formerly Chinese Turkestan). Black nephrite is also abundant in the Karakash River but these deposits are rarely reported in the primary nephrite finds.

The Karakash Valley was also a caravan road for the north–south trade between Yarkand (China) and Leh over the Karakoram Pass in Leh District of Ladakh.

== See also ==
- List of rivers in China
- Geography of Ladakh
