= Transport in Tibet =

Ways of Travel in Tibet

Transport in Tibet has steadily improved with the rapid development of the local economy.

== Air transport ==
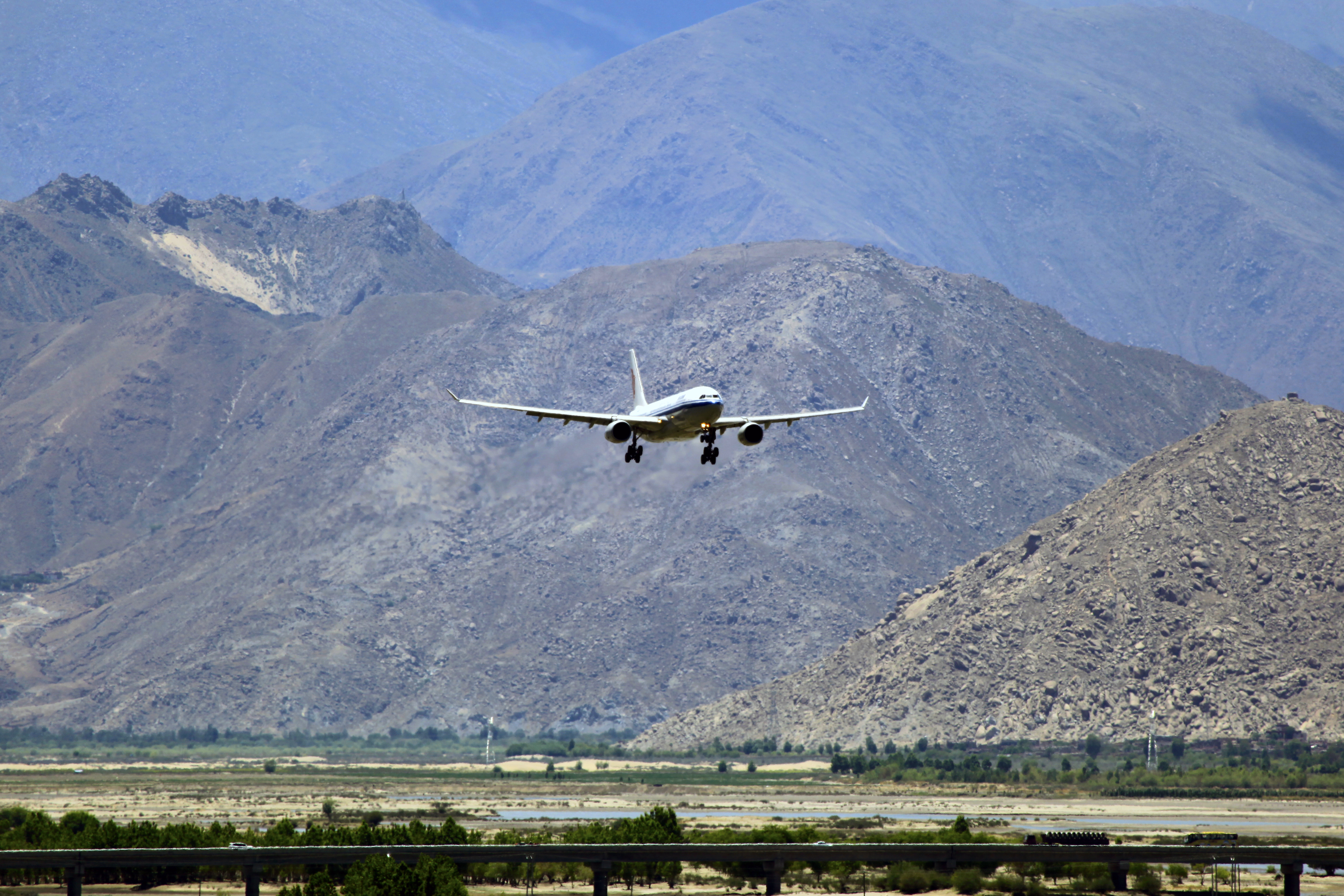
A plane at Lhasa Gonggar Airport

There are five airports in Tibet, Lhasa Gonngar International Airport, Nyingchi Mainling Airport, Shigatse Peace Airport, Qamdo Bangda Airport, and Ngari Gunsa Airport. There is one international flight to Kathmandu, the capital of Nepal.

== Rail transport ==
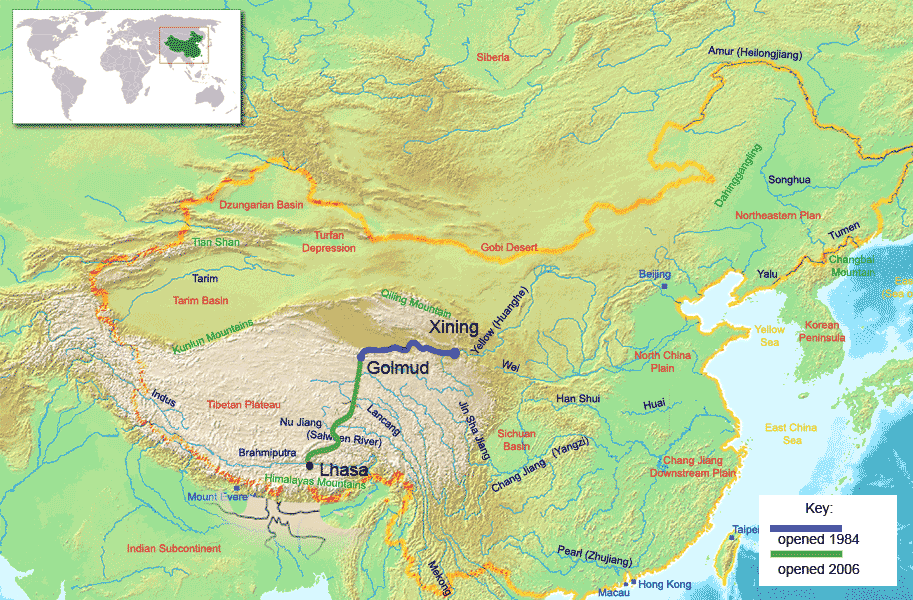
Map of Qinghai–Tibet railway

The section between Golmud and Lhasa of Qinghai–Tibet railway was inaugurated on 1 July 2006.

== Road transport ==
Four national highways connect mainland China with Tibet:

- Qinghai-Tibet Highway,
- Sichuan-Tibet Highway,
- Xinjiang-Tibet Highway,
- and Yunnan-Tibet Highway.

In addition, the Sino-Nepal friendship highway is the only international highway to Tibet.

There exist regular buses between Lhasa and major towns in Tibet.

== See also ==
- Transport in Qinghai
