= Kirgizjangal Pass =

Mountain pass in Xinjiang, China

Kirgizjangal Pass (Kekeate Pass) (Heiqiazi Pass)
- Heika/Heiqia Pass
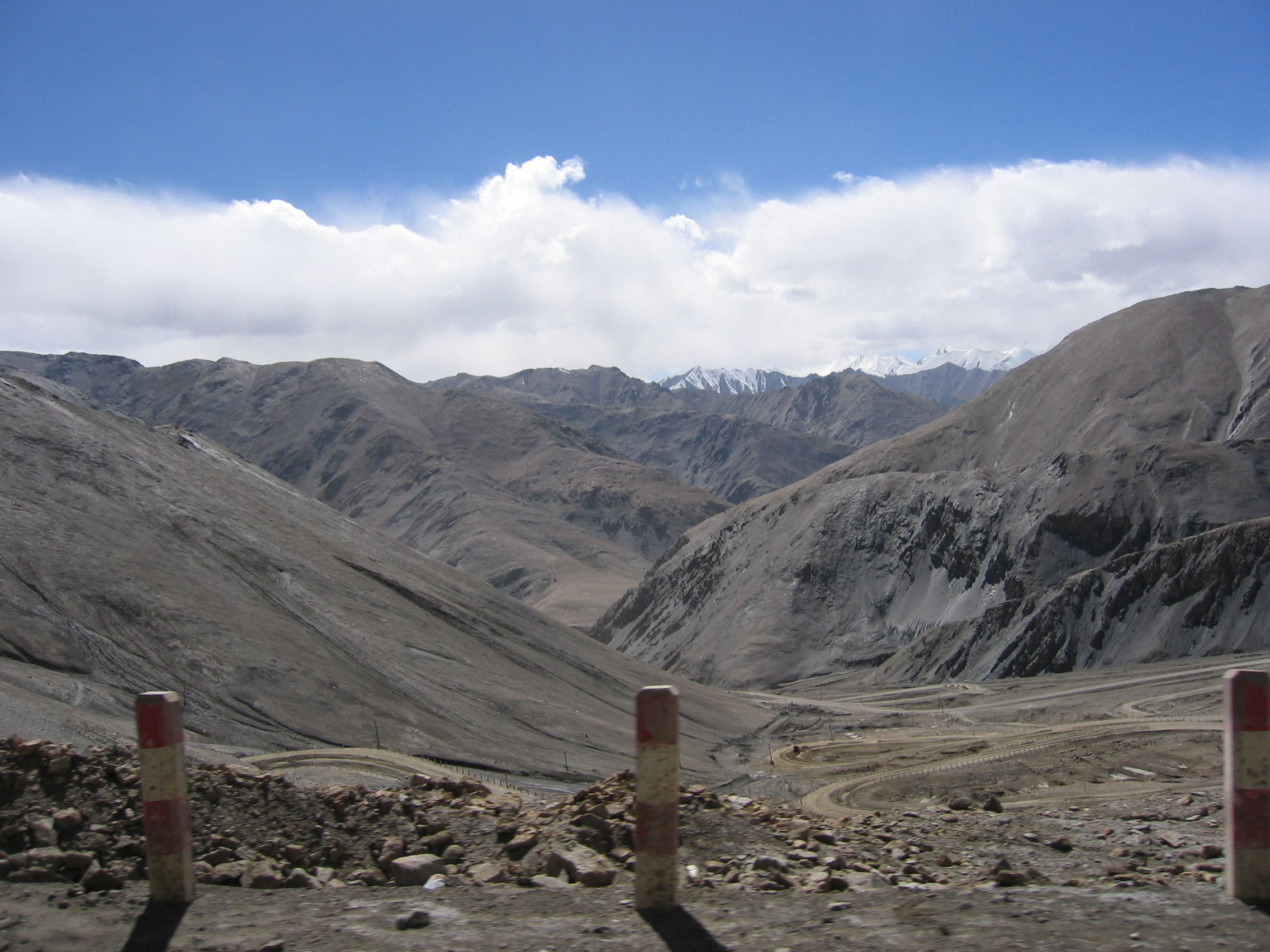
- Westbound view with the many hairpin turns

- Location within Southern Xinjiang
- Interactive map of Kirgizjangal Pass (Kekeate Pass) (Heiqiazi Pass)
- Elevation: 4,909 metres (16,106 ft)
- Traversed by: G219

Third Approach
- Location: Kargilik County and Hotan County in Xinjiang, China
- Range: Kunlun Mountains
- Coordinates: 36.431°N 77.579°E

Kekeate Pass
- Traditional Chinese: 柯克阿特達坂
- Simplified Chinese: 柯克阿特达坂
Transcriptions
Standard Mandarin
- Hanyu Pinyin: Kēkèā'ěrtè Dábǎn

Heiqiazi Daban
- Traditional Chinese: 黑卡子達坂
- Simplified Chinese: 黑卡子达坂
- Literal meaning: Black hairpin pass
Transcriptions
Standard Mandarin
- Hanyu Pinyin: Hēiqiǎzi Dábǎn

Heiqia Pass
- Traditional Chinese: 黑恰達坂
- Simplified Chinese: 黑恰达坂
Transcriptions
Standard Mandarin
- Hanyu Pinyin: Hēiqià Dábǎn

Kekeate Pass (Chinese: 柯克阿特达坂; pinyin: Kēkèā'ěrtè Dábǎn), also known as Heiqiazi Pass, Heika Pass or Heiqia Daban^{[hqz]}(Chinese: 黑卡子达坂; pinyin: Hēiqiǎzi Dábǎn; lit. 'black hairpin pass') is a mountain pass along the China National Highway 219 with numerous hairpin turns. The mountain pass connects the Yarkand River valley to the west with the Karakash River valley to the east. Located at 309 kilometres (192 mi) from the northern terminus of the G219 highway, it is between the village of Mazar in Kargilik County and the town of Xaidulla in Hotan County near the boundary of the two counties. Western sources often know it as Kirgizjangal Pass,

== History ==
The name Kirgizjangal references the nearby historically infamous location of Kirghiz Jangal (Chinese: 黑黑子将杆/黑黑孜江干^{[hhz]}), which literally means "Kirghiz jungle" or "Kirghiz thicket." Located about 10 kilometres (6 mi) to the west, it was a location best avoided by caravan traders between the Indian subcontinent and Tarim Basin (southern Xinjiang). Prior to the Qing dynasty conquest of Xinjiang, the area was inhabited by Kirghiz nomads. The Kirghiz from the region were known to be bandits. They would rob caravans and sell its crew into slavery in Badakhshan. When the Qing dynasty first took control of the region in the late 1700s, they expelled the Kirghiz from the area. However, when the Qing control of region weakened during the Taiping Rebellion and Dungan Revolt in the 1850s-1870s, the Kirghiz returned. This along with the economic impacts of those rebellions led to reduction in trade along the caravan route between the Indian subcontinent and Tarim Basin.

There are numerous buildings in the area built to host highway maintenance squads, many of them are now abandoned. In recent years, a few mining operations have been started to the west of the mountain pass, producing siderite iron ore and potentially copper.

== See also ==
- Xaidulla
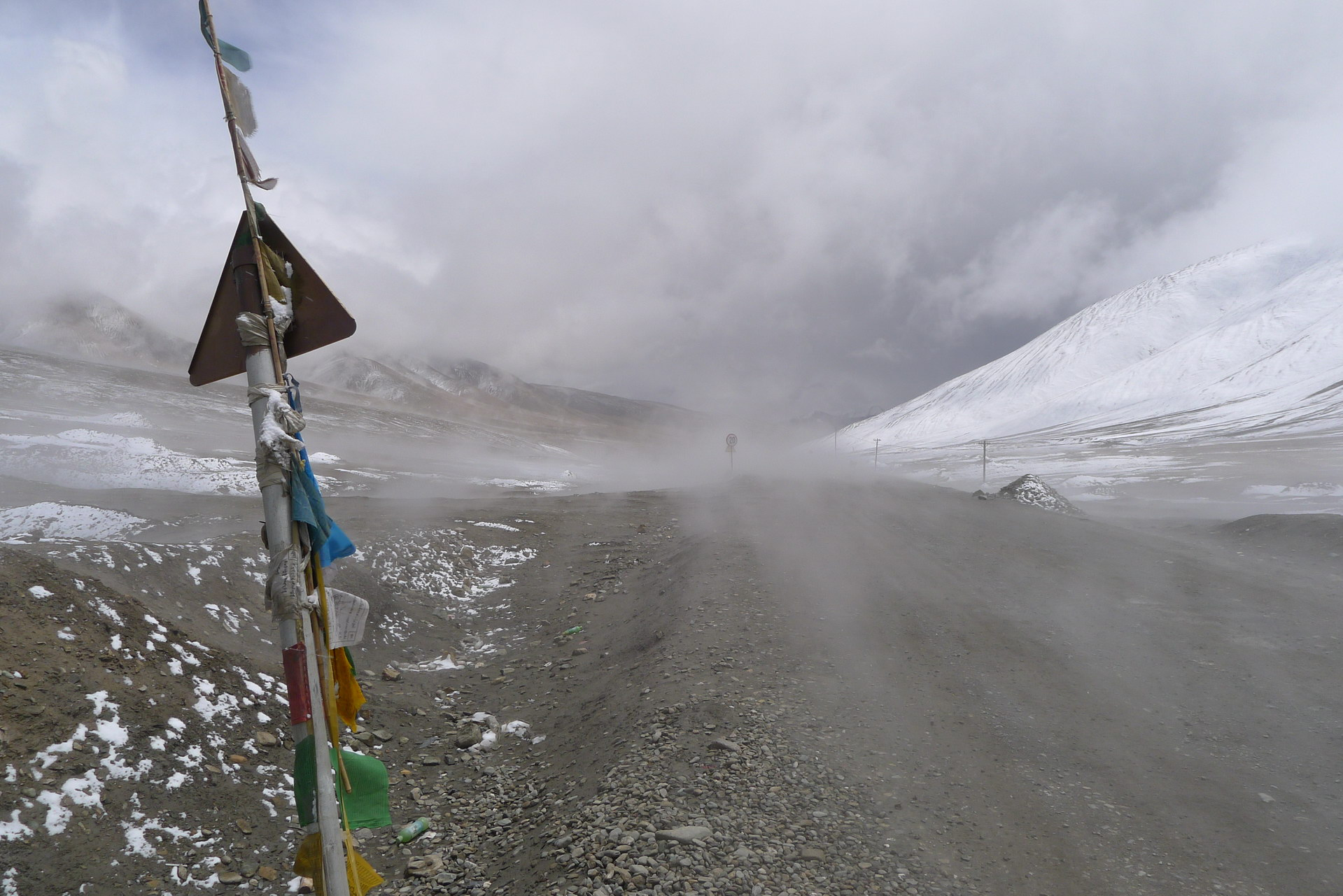
Eastbound view partly concealed by dust of passing vehicle

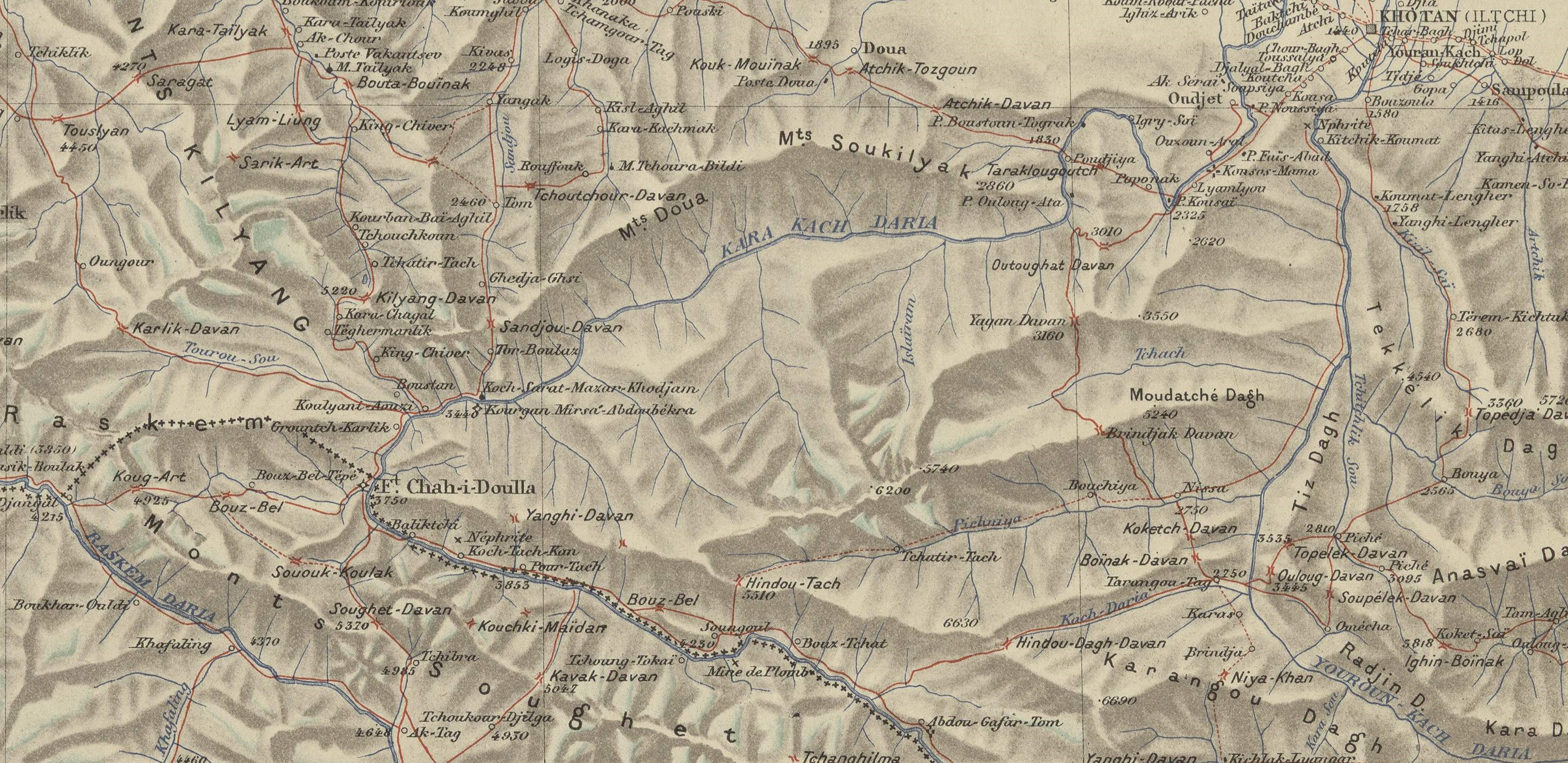
French map where it is labelled as Koug-Art

== Notes ==
- ^{hqz} - There are numerous variations in the Chinese name, and there are numerous permutations in transcription. In Chinese, the character 卡 is a heteronym with multiple pronunciations. The character 子 is a diminutive modifier in this context thus can be dropped. In addition, 达坂 meaning "mountain pass" is sometimes transcribed phonetically as "Daban".
- ^{hhz} - In Chinese, "黑黑子" is an archaic word for Kirghiz.
