= Kom-Kanas Mongol Ethnic Township =

Kom-Kanas Mongol Ethnic Township 禾木喀纳斯蒙古族乡
- Ethnic township

Chinese transcription(s)
  - Pinyin: Hémù Kānàsī Ménggǔzú Xiāng

Mongolian transcription(s)
  - Mongolian Cyrillic: Ком-Канас
- Interactive map of Kom-Kanas Mongol Ethnic Township
- Coordinates: 48.5733590°N 87.4369267°E
- Country: China
- Autonomous region: Xinjiang
- Prefecture: Altay Prefecture
- County: Burqin County

Population
  - Total: 2,099
- Time zone: UTC+8 (China Standard Time)

Kom-Kanas Mongol Ethnic Township

Chinese name
- Simplified Chinese: 禾木哈纳斯蒙古族乡
Transcriptions
Standard Mandarin
- Hanyu Pinyin: Hémùhānàsī Ménggǔzú Xiāng

Mongolian name
- Mongolian Cyrillic: Хом ханаас монгол үндэстэний шиян
- Mongolian script: ᠬᠣᠮ ᠬᠠᠨᠠᠰ ᠮᠣᠩᠭᠣᠯ ᠦᠨᠳᠦᠰᠦᠲᠡᠨ ᠦ ᠰᠢᠶᠠᠩ

Uyghur name
- Uyghur: قۇمقاناس موڭغۇل يېزىسى

Kazakh name
- Kazakh: قومقاناس موڭعۇل ۇلتتىق اۋىلى; Қомқанас Моңғұл Ұлттық ауылы

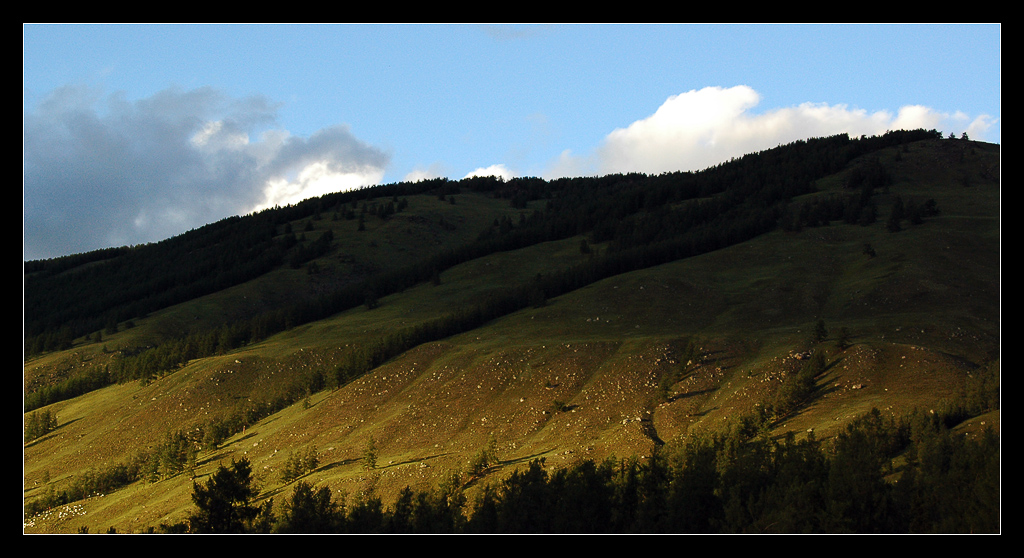
Kanas village

Kom-Kanas Mongol Ethnic Township (Oirat: ᠬᠣᠮ ᠬᠠᠨᠠᠰ
ᠮᠣᠩᠭᠣᠯ
ᠦᠨᠳᠦᠰᠦᠲᠡᠨ ᠦ
ᠰᠢᠶᠠᠩ ꭓom ꭓanas moŋɣol ündüsüten-ü siyaŋ; Uyghur: قۇمقاناس موڭغۇل يېزىسى; Kazakh: قومقاناس موڭعۇل ۇلتتىق اۋىلى; Chinese: 禾木哈纳斯蒙古族乡; pinyin: Hémùhānàsī Ménggǔzú Xiāng), generally known as Kom-Kanas, is a township of Burqin County, Altay Prefecture, Xinjiang Uyghur Autonomous Region, China. The name derives from the two villages where most of the inhabitants live, Kom (township seat), and Kanas.

It is the northernmost township in Xinjiang and northwest China and the start of China National Highway 219. Kanas Lake is located entirely in the township.

The township is one of the few areas in China where Tuvans live and the Tuvan language is still spoken. However, no official census data about the Tuvan population is available, since they are an unrecognized ethnic group in China.

== See also ==
- List of township-level divisions of Xinjiang
