= Mazar Pass =

Mountain pass in China

Mazar Pass (Sailiyake Pass)
- Chiragsaldi Pass
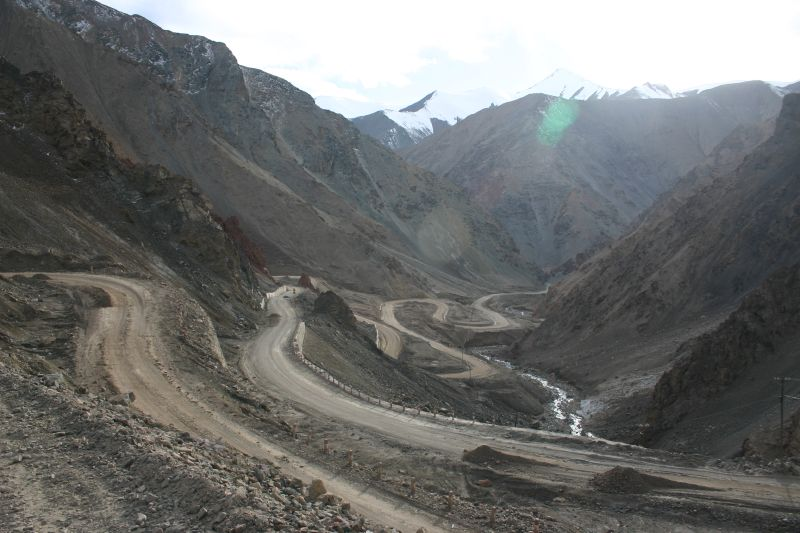
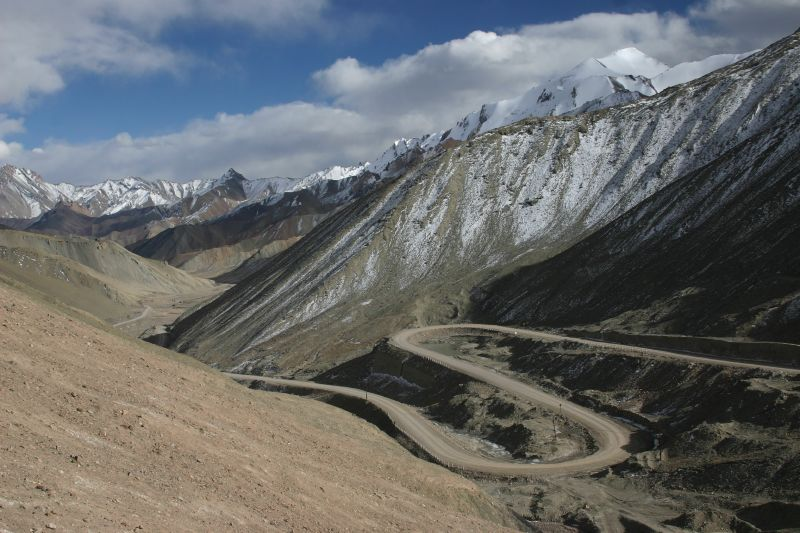
- Southbound view Sorthbound view

- Location within Southern Xinjiang
- Interactive map of Mazar Pass (Sailiyake Pass)
- Elevation: 4,969 metres (16,302 ft)
- Length: 40 kilometres (25 mi)
- Traversed by: G219

Third Approach
- Location: Kargilik County, Xinjiang, China
- Range: Kunlun Mountains
- Coordinates: 36.579°N 77.0035°E

Mazar Pass
- Traditional Chinese: 麻扎達坂
- Simplified Chinese: 麻扎达坂
Transcriptions
Standard Mandarin
- Hanyu Pinyin: Mázhā dábǎn

Alternative Chinese name
- Traditional Chinese: 賽力亞克達坂
- Simplified Chinese: 赛力亚克达坂
Transcriptions
Standard Mandarin
- Hanyu Pinyin: Sàilìyàkè Dábǎn

Mazar Pass (Chinese: 麻扎达坂; pinyin: Mázhā dábǎn), also called Sailyak Pass(Chinese: 赛力亚克达坂; pinyin: Sàilìyàkè Dábǎn) is a long mountain pass with numerous hairpin turns along China National Highway 219 (G219), the highway connecting Xinjiang and Tibet. The mountain pass crosses the Kunlun Mountains. It is between the villages of Kudi and Mazar in Kargilik County in southwestern Xinjiang. Western sources often refer to it as Chiragsaldi Pass.

The pass is located 240 kilometres (150 mi) from the northern terminus of the G219 highway. At about 40 kilometres (25 mi) long, it is the longest mountain pass on the Xinjiang-Tibet highway. The highway was first completed in 1957, and fully asphalted in 2013.

The small village to the south Mazar was so named because it was the site of two Uyghur mazars. The village contains a Chinese army service station. In recent decades, it also serves as a truck stop for the G219 highway and stop for expeditions en route to K2.

Chiragsaldi Pass was the name used by British explorers during the late 1800s, likewise, Mazar village which at the time was only a caravan campsite was referred to as Chiragsaldi. This name means "the lamp blew out" referencing the windiness of the campsite. French army map from early 1900s showed Chiragsaldi Pass (Tchirak-Soldi) and Sailyak Pass (Sarrakh) were different mountain passes, one going west and other going east from the same valley.
