= Kargilik County =

Kargilik County قاغىلىق ناھىيىسى (Uyghur) 叶城县 (Chinese) Yecheng County
- County
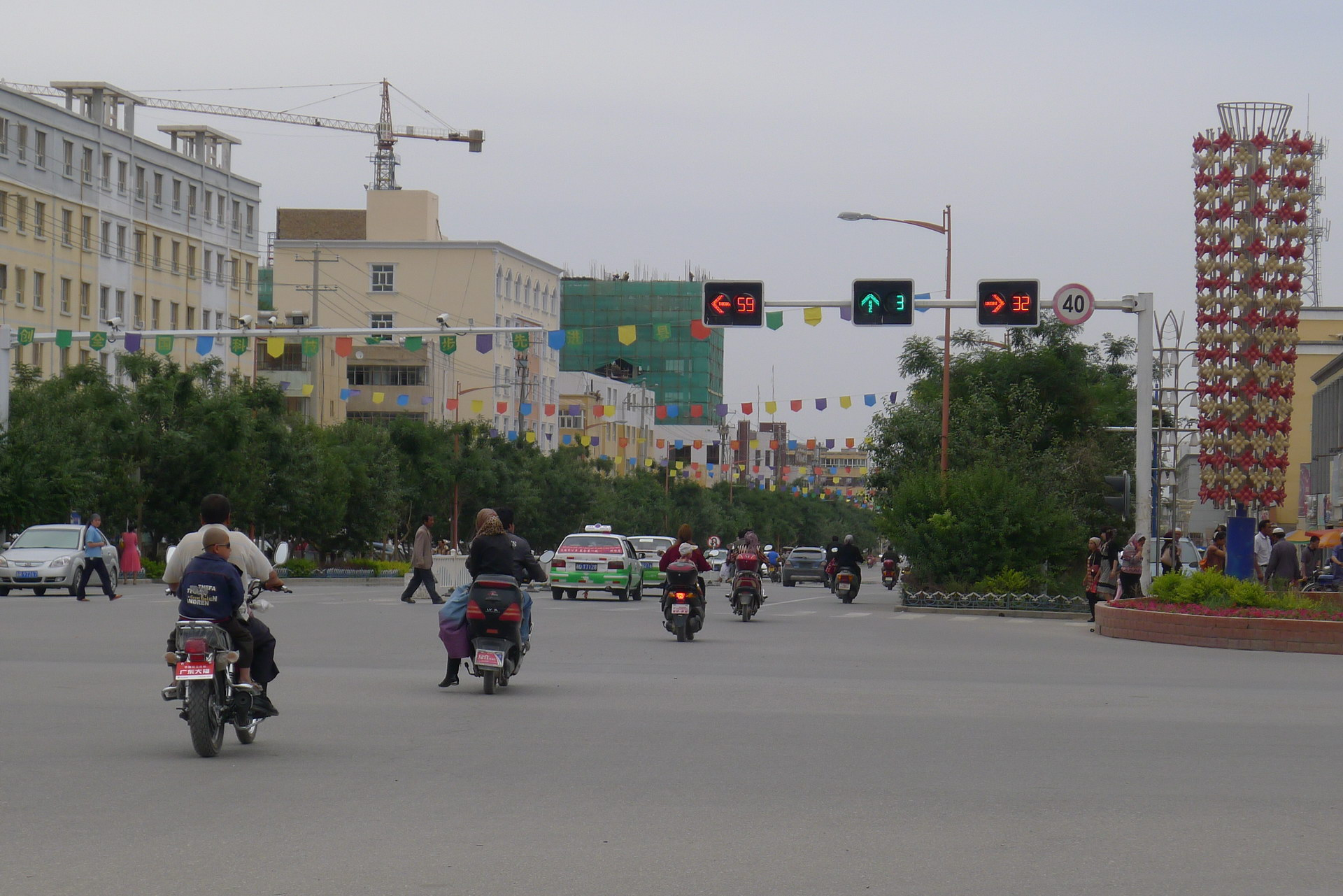

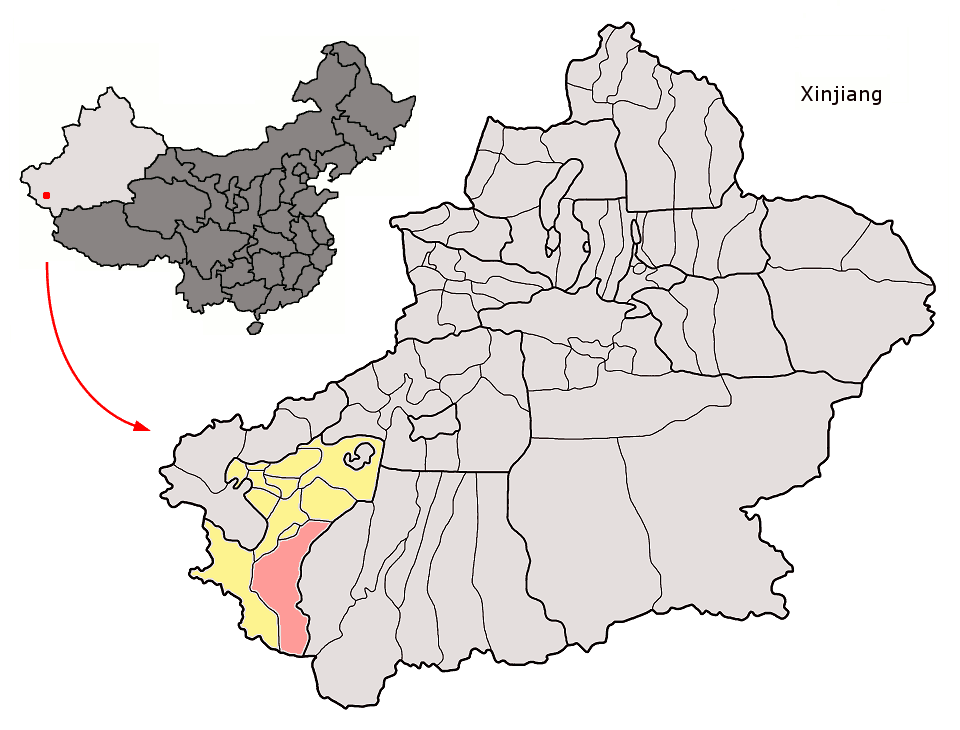
- Location of Kargilik County (red) within Kashgar Prefecture (yellow) and Xinjiang

- Location of the seat in Xinjiang Kargilik (Xinjiang) Kargilik (China)
- Coordinates: 37°53′06″N 77°24′47″E
- Country: China
- Autonomous region: Xinjiang
- Prefecture: Kashgar
- County seat: Kargilik

Area
  - Total: 28,558.89 km^{2} (11,026.65 sq mi)

Population (2020)
  - Total: 525,436
  - Density: 18.3983/km^{2} (47.6515/sq mi)

Ethnic groups
  - Major ethnic groups: Uyghur, Han Chinese
- Time zone: UTC+8 (China Standard (Note: Locals in Xinjiang frequently observe UTC+6 (Xinjiang Time), 2 hours behind Beijing.))
- Postal code: 844900
- Website: www.xjyc.gov.cn (in Chinese)

Kargilik County

Uyghur name
- Uyghur: قاغىلىق ناھىيىسى
Transcriptions
- Latin Yëziqi: Qaghiliq nahiyisi
- Yengi Yeziⱪ: Ⱪaƣiliⱪ naⱨiyisi
- SASM/GNC: Kargilik nahiyisi
- Siril Yëziqi: Қағилиқ наһийиси

Chinese name
- Traditional Chinese: 葉城縣
- Simplified Chinese: 叶城县
Transcriptions
Standard Mandarin
- Hanyu Pinyin: Yèchéng Xiàn
- Wade–Giles: Yeh^{4}-ch'eng^{2} Hsien^{4}

Alternative Chinese name
- Traditional Chinese: 喀格勒克縣
- Simplified Chinese: 喀格勒克县
Transcriptions
Standard Mandarin
- Hanyu Pinyin: Kāgélèkè Xiàn

Kargilik County (Uyghur: قاغىلىق ناھىيىسى), also known as Yecheng County (Chinese: 叶城县), is a county in southwest of the Xinjiang Uyghur Autonomous Region and is under the administration of the Kashgar Prefecture. It contains an area of 28,600 km^{2}. To the north, the county borders Makit County. To the east, the county borders Guma County (Pishan) in Hotan Prefecture. To the west, the county borders Yarkant County, Poskam County and Taxkorgan Tajik Autonomous County. In the south, the county has a border of more than 80 km (50 mi) with Pakistan and India administered areas of Kashmir.

== History ==
In 1975, future Chinese Communist Party Deputy Committee Secretary of the Xinjiang Uyghur Autonomous Region Zhu Hailun was sent to Kargilik County in the Down to the Countryside Movement.

== Geography ==
The northern part of the county is in the Taklamakan Desert and the southern part of the county is in the Kunlun Mountains. Mazar Pass is located in the southern part of the county.

== Climate ==
Climate data for Kargilik, elevation 1,360 m (4,460 ft), (1991–2020 normals, extremes 1981–present)
Month	Jan	Feb	Mar	Apr	May	Jun	Jul	Aug	Sep	Oct	Nov	Dec	Year
Record high °C (°F)	20.2 (68.4)	25.2 (77.4)	31.5 (88.7)	34.0 (93.2)	36.8 (98.2)	40.2 (104.4)	40.2 (104.4)	38.1 (100.6)	33.3 (91.9)	29.2 (84.6)	24.6 (76.3)	19.0 (66.2)	40.2 (104.4)
Mean daily maximum °C (°F)	1.1 (34.0)	6.7 (44.1)	15.8 (60.4)	23.3 (73.9)	27.3 (81.1)	30.8 (87.4)	32.3 (90.1)	30.7 (87.3)	26.6 (79.9)	20.5 (68.9)	12.1 (53.8)	3.3 (37.9)	19.2 (66.6)
Daily mean °C (°F)	−4.7 (23.5)	0.9 (33.6)	9.4 (48.9)	16.5 (61.7)	20.4 (68.7)	23.9 (75.0)	25.5 (77.9)	24.2 (75.6)	19.9 (67.8)	13.1 (55.6)	4.9 (40.8)	−2.5 (27.5)	12.6 (54.7)
Mean daily minimum °C (°F)	−9.5 (14.9)	−3.9 (25.0)	3.7 (38.7)	10.5 (50.9)	14.3 (57.7)	17.9 (64.2)	19.7 (67.5)	18.7 (65.7)	14.1 (57.4)	6.8 (44.2)	−0.7 (30.7)	−7.0 (19.4)	7.1 (44.7)
Record low °C (°F)	−20.8 (−5.4)	−20.8 (−5.4)	−7.1 (19.2)	0.0 (32.0)	4.9 (40.8)	9.3 (48.7)	11.7 (53.1)	10.0 (50.0)	3.6 (38.5)	−2.2 (28.0)	−12.2 (10.0)	−21.9 (−7.4)	−21.9 (−7.4)
Average precipitation mm (inches)	2.8 (0.11)	2.8 (0.11)	5.4 (0.21)	4.7 (0.19)	17.0 (0.67)	11.7 (0.46)	11.3 (0.44)	11.1 (0.44)	9.0 (0.35)	1.0 (0.04)	1.8 (0.07)	1.5 (0.06)	80.1 (3.15)
Average precipitation days (≥ 0.1 mm)	2.5	2.1	1.4	1.7	3.4	4.5	4.0	3.6	2.7	0.5	0.6	1.9	28.9
Average snowy days	5.7	3.4	0.6	0.1	0	0	0	0	0	0	0.6	4.5	14.9
Average relative humidity (%)	58	50	38	33	38	40	44	48	49	45	48	59	46
Mean monthly sunshine hours	180.8	177.2	216.1	229.3	272.2	295.8	295.6	262.2	251.0	261.0	218.3	179.7	2,839.2
Percentage possible sunshine	59	57	57	57	61	67	67	63	69	77	73	61	64
Source: China Meteorological Administrationall-time extreme temperatureall-time February high

== Administrative divisions ==
Kargilik County contains 6 towns and 15 townships.

Name	Simplified Chinese	Hanyu Pinyin	Uyghur (UEY)	Uyghur Latin (ULY)	Administrative division code	Notes
Towns
Kargilik Town	喀格勒克镇	Kāgélèkè Zhèn	پوسكام بازىرى	qaghiliq baziri	653126100	
Charbagh Town	恰尔巴格镇	Qià'ěrbāgé Zhèn	چارباغ بازىرى	charbagh baziri	653126101	
Ushsharbash Town	乌夏巴什镇	Wūxiàbāshí Zhèn	ئۇششارباش بازىرى	Ushsharbash baziri	653126102	
Aqash Town	阿克塔什镇	Ākètǎshí Zhèn	ئاقتاش بازىرى	Aqtash baziri	653126103	
Jinguo Town	金果镇	Jīnguǒ Zhèn	جىنگو بازىرى	jingo baziri	653126104	Formerly Chasa Meschit Township (چاسا مەسچىت يېزىسى / 恰萨美其特乡)
Yitimliqum Town	依提木孔镇	Kāgélèkè Zhèn	يىتىملىقۇم بازىرى	yitimliqum baziri	653126105	Formerly Yitimliqum Township (يىتىملىقۇم يېزىسى / 依提木孔乡)
Townships
Loq Township	洛克乡	Luòkè Xiāng	لوق يېزىسى	loq yëzisi	653126200	
Besheriq Township	伯西热克乡	Bóxīrèkè Xiāng	بەشئېرىق يېزىسى	besh'ëriq yëzisi	653126201	
Tetir Township	铁提乡	Tiětí Xiāng	تېتىر يېزىسى	tëtir yëzisi	653126202	
Tögichi Township	吐古其乡	Tǔgǔqí Xiāng	تۆگىچى يېزىسى	tögichi yëzisi	653126204	
Janggilieski Township	江格勒斯乡	Jiānggélèsī Xiāng	جاڭگىلىئەسكى يېزىسى	janggili'eski yëzisi	653126205	
Jayterak Township	加依提勒克乡	Jiāyītílèkè Xiāng	جايتېرەك يېزىسى	jaytërek yëzisi	653126206	
Barin Township	巴仁乡	Bārén Xiāng	بارىن يېزىسى	barin yëzisi	653126207	
Ghojaeriq Township	乌吉热克乡	Wūjírèkè Xiāng	غوجائېرىق يېزىسى	ghoja'ëriq yëzisi	653126208	
Shaxap Township	夏合甫乡	Wūjírèkè Xiāng	شاخاپ يېزىسى	shaxap yëzisi	653126209	
Yilkiqi Township	依力克其乡	Yīlìkèqí Xiāng	يىلقىچى يېزىسى	yilqichi yëzisi	653126210	
Zunglang Township	宗朗乡	Zōnglǎng Xiāng	زۇڭلاڭ يېزىسى	zunglang yëzisi	653126212	
Kokyar Township	柯克亚乡	Kēkèyà Xiāng	كۆكيار يېزىسى	kökyar yëzisi	653126213	
Shixshu Township	西合休乡	Xīhéxiū Xiāng	شىخشۇ يېزىسى	shixshu yëzisi	653126214	
Chipan Township	棋盘乡	Qípán Xiāng	چىپان يېزىسى	chipan yëzisi	653126215	
Saybagh Township	萨依巴格乡	Sàyībāgé Xiāng	سايباغ يېزىسى	saybagh yëzisi	653126216	

== Economy ==
Kargilik County's economy is based on agriculture and animal husbandry. Agricultural products include wheat, corn and cotton, as well as pomegranates, yellow pears, walnuts, and dried apricots. Industries include construction, machinery, electronics, and food processing. The county is known for the 'Kargilik Banximao Sheep' (叶城半细毛羊).

== Demographics ==
Historical population
Year	Pop.	±% p.a.
2000	370,229	—
2010	454,328	+2.07%

In 1997, Uyghurs made up 93% of the population of the county and Han Chinese made up 6% of the population.

As of 2015, 490,417 of the 519,962 residents of the county were Uyghur, 23,408 were Han Chinese and 6,137 were from other ethnic groups.

As of 2018, Uyghurs made up 91% of the population of the county.

As of 1999, 90.78% of the population of Kargilik (Yecheng) County was Uyghur and 8.18% of the population was Han Chinese.

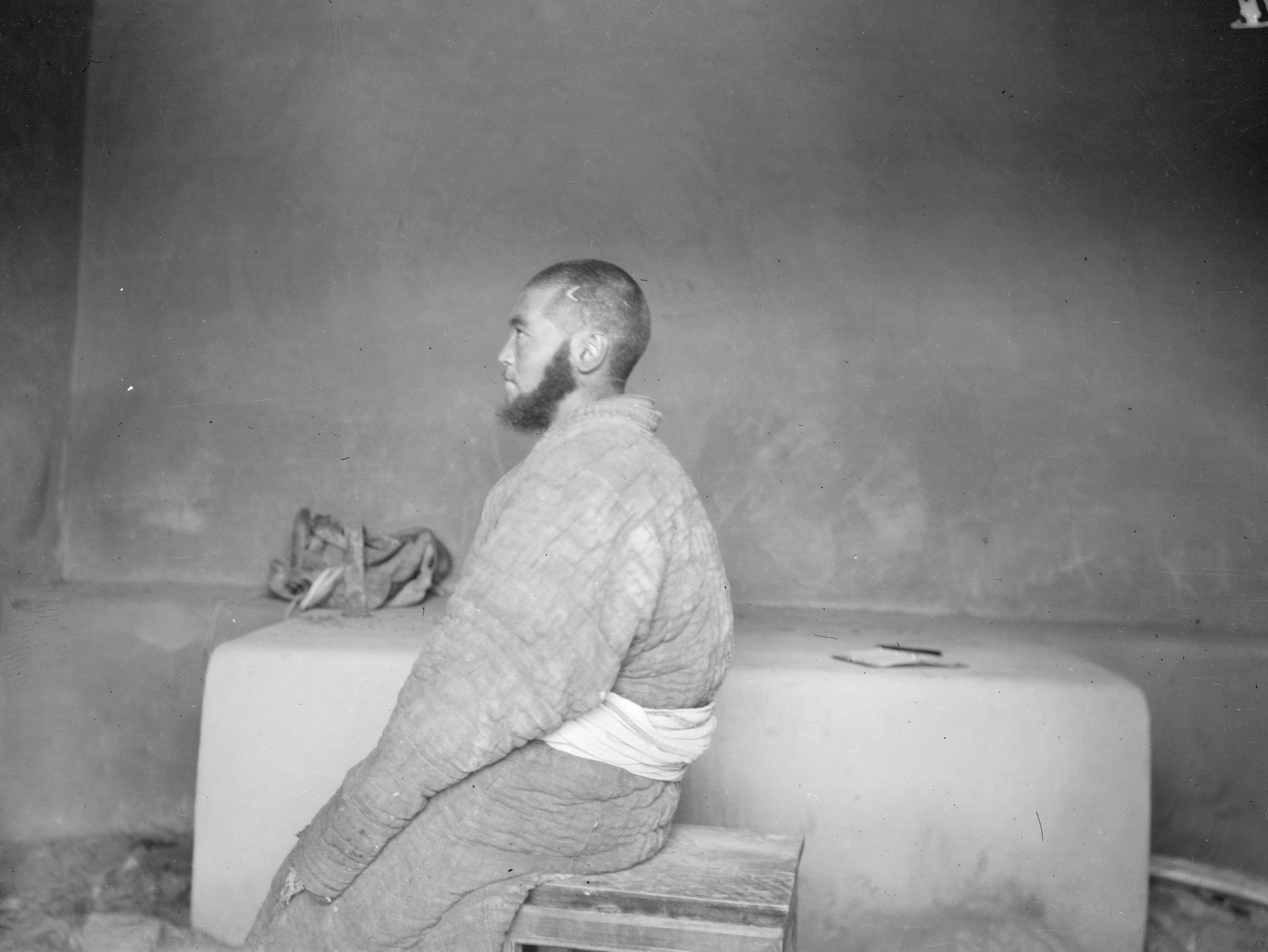
20 year old pakhpu Akbai in Karghalik, c. 1907

== Transportation ==
- China National Highway 219
- China National Highway 315
- Kashgar–Hotan railway

== Historical maps ==
Historical English-language maps including Kargilik:

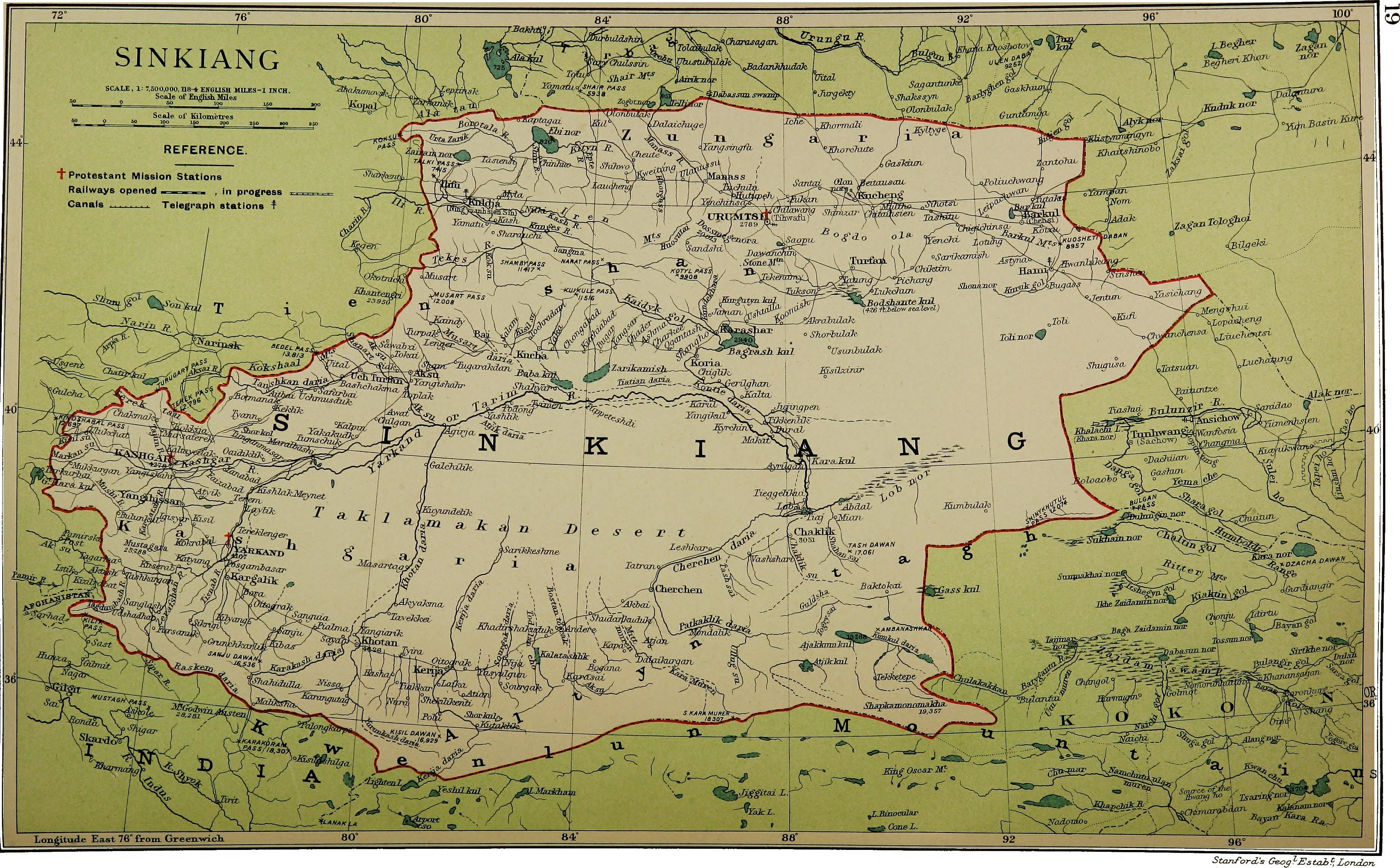
Map including Kargilik (labeled as Kargalik) (1917)

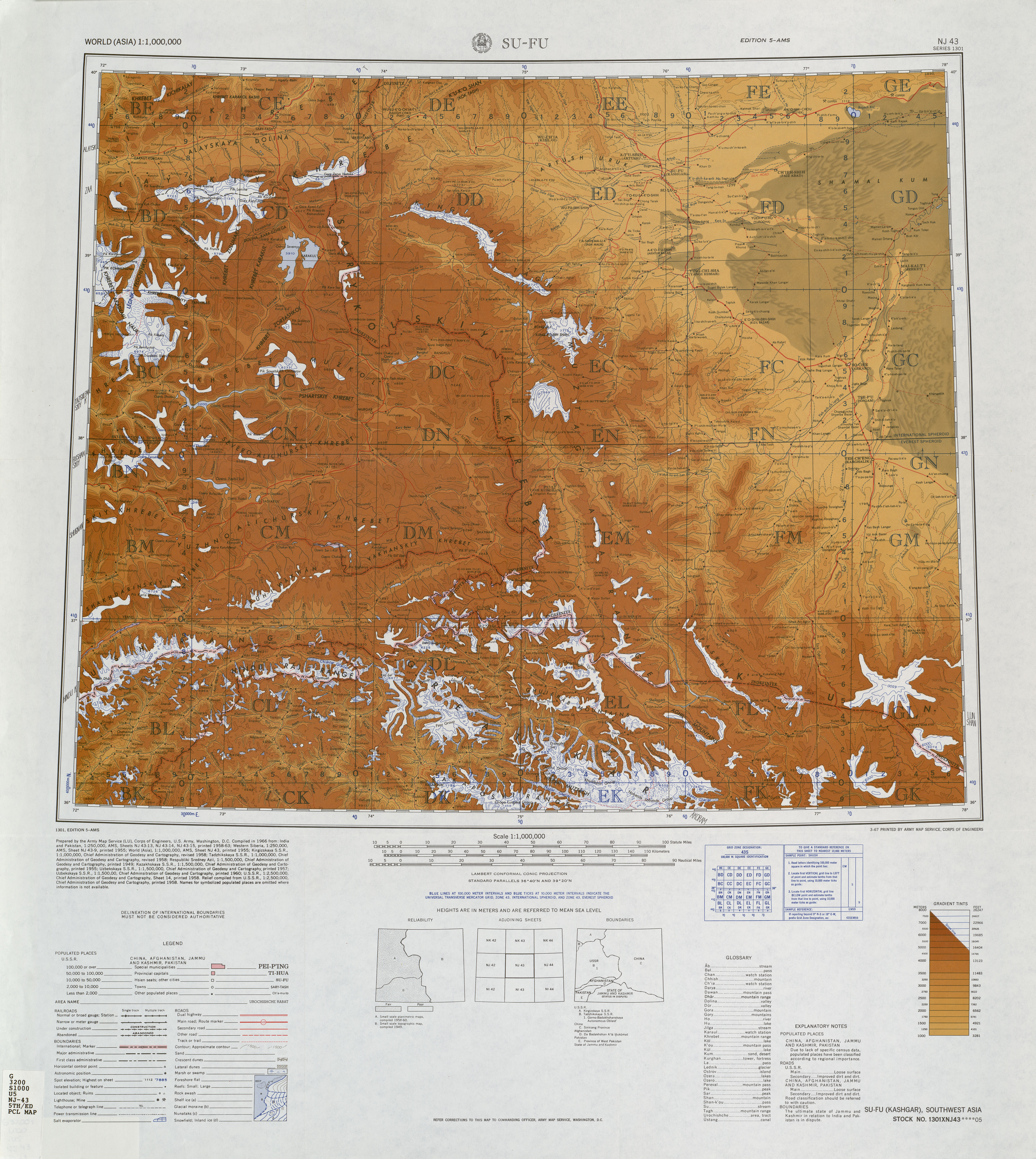
Map including Kargilik (labeled as YEH-CH'ENG (KARGHALIK)) and surrounding region from the International Map of the World (AMS, 1966)

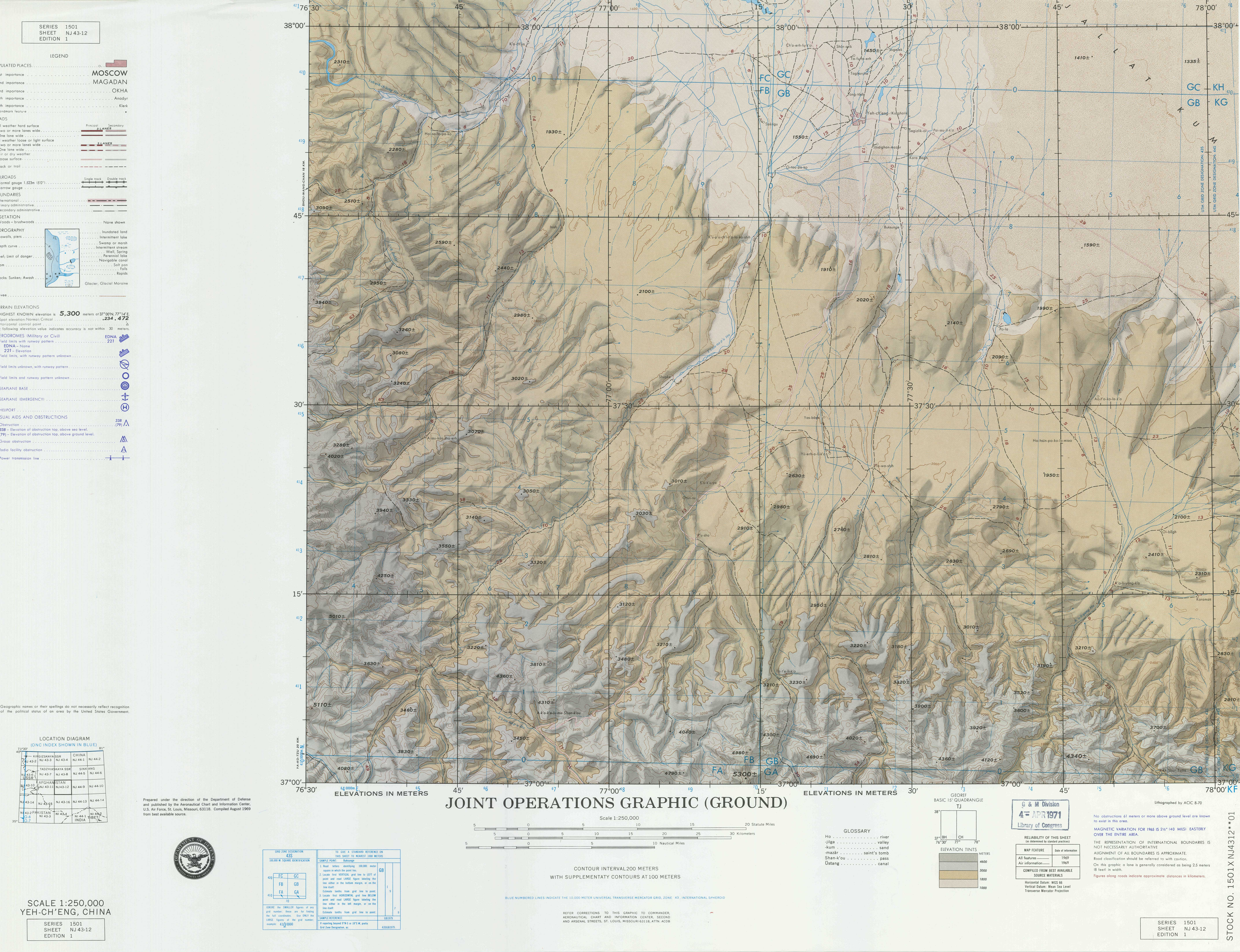
Map including Kargilik (labeled as Yeh-ch'eng (Karghalik)) (ACIC, 1969)

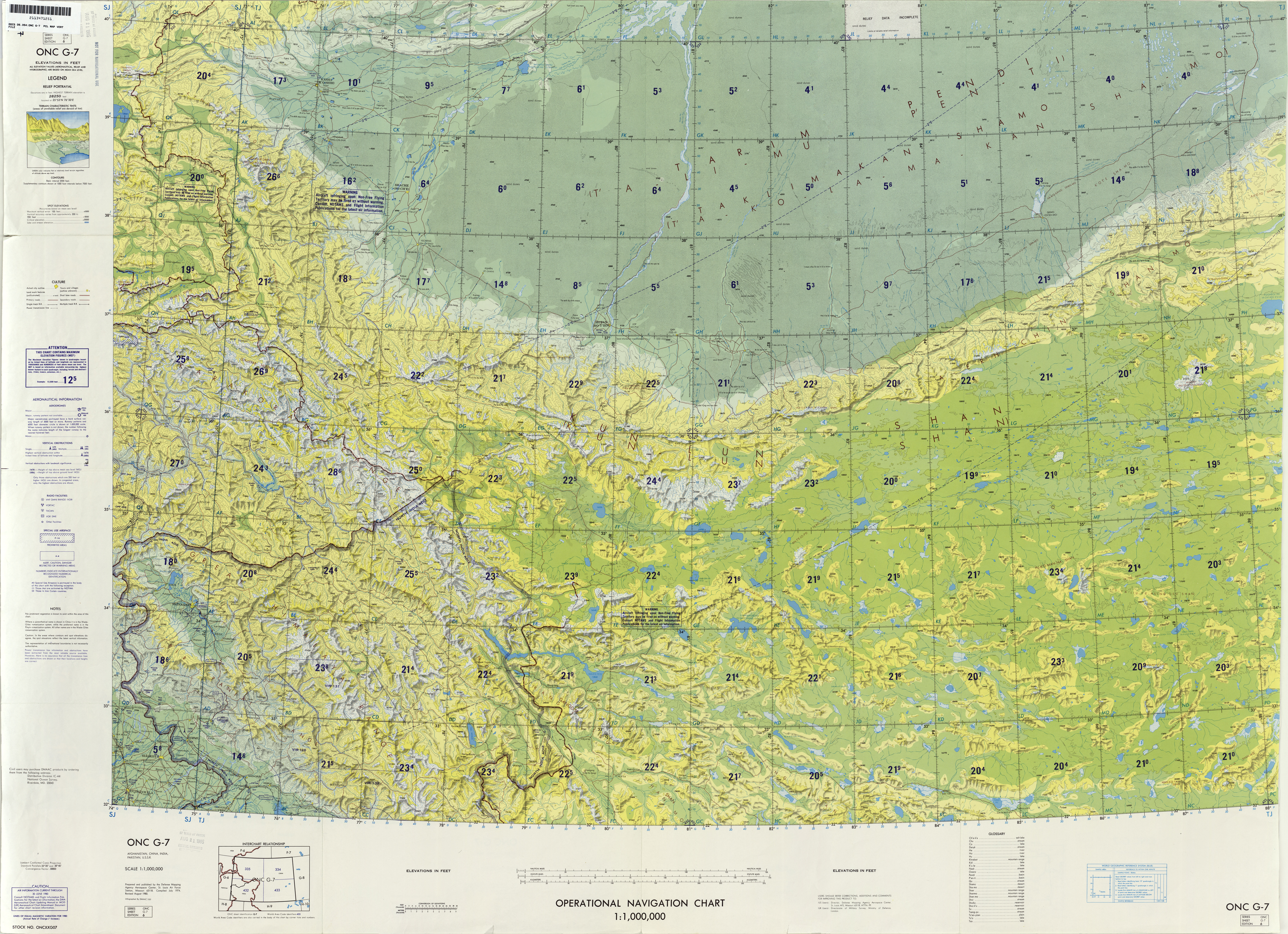
From the Operational Navigation Chart; map including Kargilik (labeled as YECHENG (YEH-CH'ENG)) (DMA, 1980) (Note: From map: "The representation of international boundaries is not necessarily authoritative.")

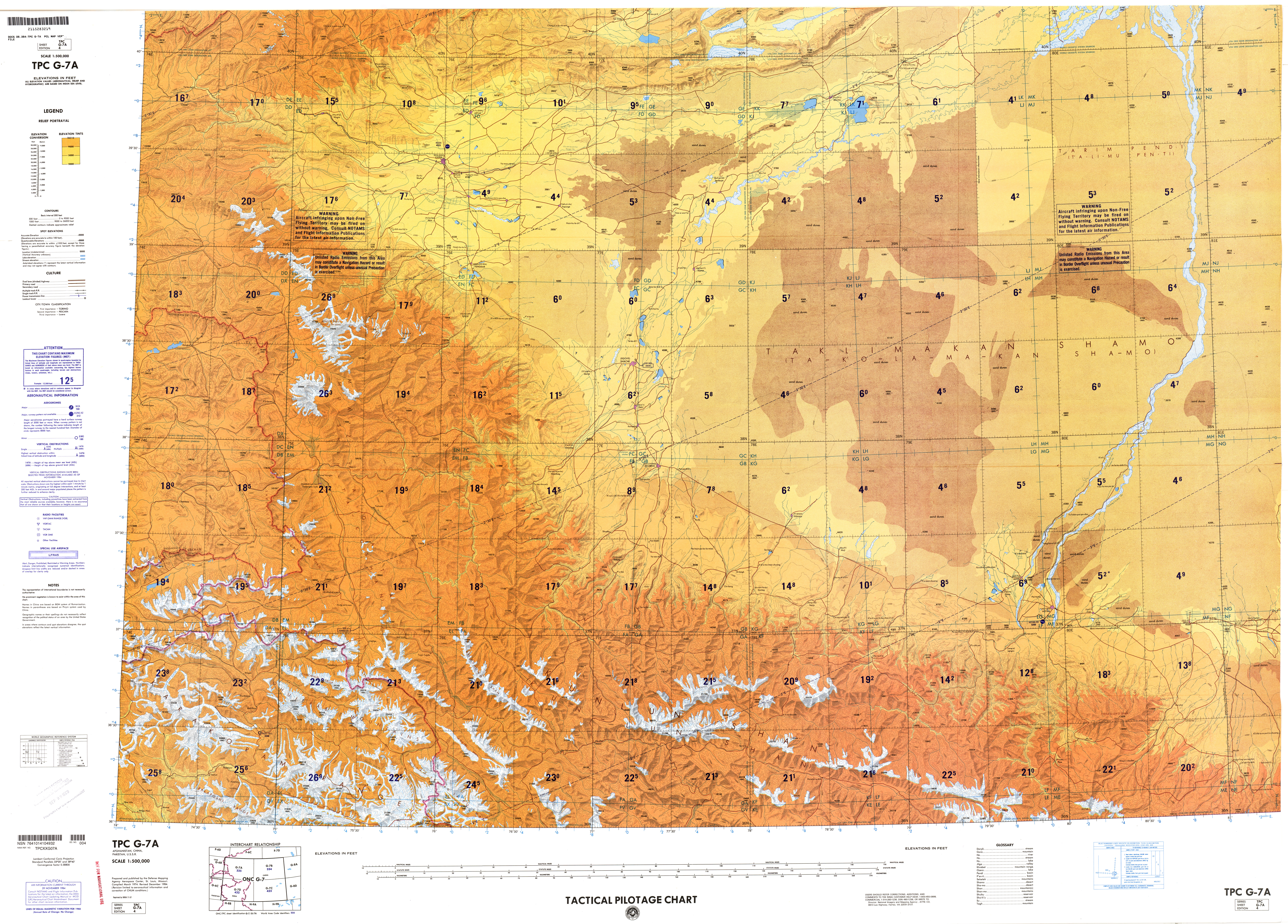
Map including Kargilik (labeled as YECHENG (YEH-CH'ENG)) (DMA, 1984) (Note: From map: "The representation of international boundaries is not necessarily authoritative")

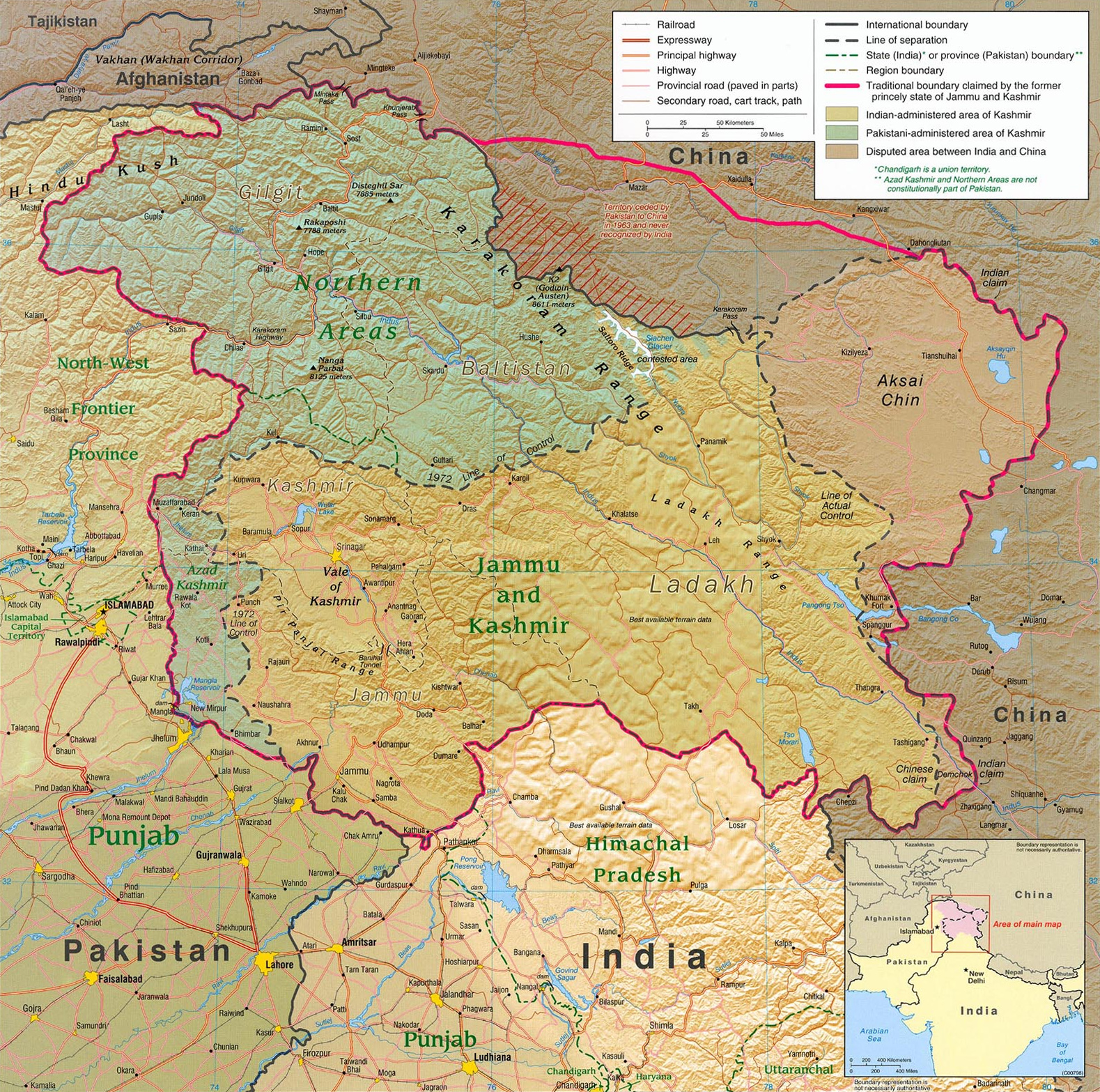
The southern part of Kargilik County includes territory ceded to China by Pakistan but claimed by India

== See also ==
- Trans-Karakoram Tract
- Yarkand River
- Bazar Dara
