= Kokyar =

Kokyar كۆكيار يېزىسى 柯克亚乡 Kök-yar, Kekeya
- Township

Chinese transcription(s)
- Location in Xinjiang
- Coordinates: 37.388987°N 77.17024836°E
- Country: China
- Province: Xinjiang
- Prefecture: Kashgar / Kashi
- County: Kargilik / Yecheng
- Villages: 18

Area
  - Total: 3,662.5 km^{2} (1,414.1 sq mi)
- Elevation: 2,200–3,500 m (7,200–11,500 ft)

Population (2010)
  - Total: 19,451
  - Density: 5.3109/km^{2} (13.755/sq mi)

Ethnic groups
  - Major ethnic groups: Uyghur, Mountain Tajik (China)
- Time zone: UTC+8 (CST)

Kokyar (Kɵkyar, Көкяр, كۆكيار, Kök-yar, Kök-yār, 库克牙, Pinyin: Kùkèyá; 柯克亚乡, Kēkèyà Xiāng) is a township headquartered at a small oasis at the base of the Kunlun Mountains in southern Kargilik County, Kashgar Prefecture, southwestern Xinjiang, China.

== History ==
In 1958, Kokyar Commune (柯克亚公社) was established.

In 1985, Kokyar Commune became Kokyar Township.

On July 6, 2016, a massive landslide killed thirty-five residents from village 6 in Kokyar Township, around 170 kilometres (110 mi) from the county seat. It took several days for rescue operations to reopen the road into the village. 352 residents were relocated.

In 2016-2017, Akemeiqite village (阿克美其特村) was disestablished and Nu'er'abati (努尔阿巴提村) was established, Amanxia (阿曼夏村) was disestablished and Halasitan village (哈拉斯坦村) was established, and Muchang village (牧场村) was established.

In 2019, a cooperative farm (种植合作社) was established in Halasitan village (哈拉斯坦村).

== Geography ==
Kokyar is a small oasis, only about 50 km (31 mi) south of Karghalik, with cultivation limited to:

... a narrow strip of ground less than half a mile across and under five miles in length, enclosed between absolutely barren slopes at the bottom of a narrow valley. The people, reckoned at about two hundred households, depend largely for their sustenance on cattle and sheep kept far away in the mountains. Nor is the configuration of the valley such that a much extended cultivation can be assumed even for an earlier period when a moister climate prevailed.

Kokyar was the first oasis reached in the Taklamakan basin after travelling the winter route north from the Karakoram Pass via Bazar Dara or from northern Hunza Valley to Yarkand along the frozen Yarkand River.

To the north, Kokyar Township borders Kargilik Town (Kageleke, Qaghiliq), to the east Ushsharbash Town (Wuxiabashi), and to the west Chipan Township (Qipan).

The average altitude in the township is between 2,200 m (7,200 ft) and 3,500 m (11,500 ft) above sea level.

== Administrative divisions ==
As of 2019, Kokyar Township includes eighteen villages divided into four areas (片区) (Mandarin Chinese pinyin-derived names except where noted):

Areas (片区):

- Kekeya (柯克亚), Momuke (莫木克), Guosasi (果萨斯), Xihefu (西合甫)

Villages (村):

- Ying'awati (英阿瓦提村) 37.404986°N 77.199704°E
- Kekeya (柯克亚村) 37.401356°N 77.202839°E
- Outunsu / Otan-su / Otansu (欧吞苏村) 37.374174°N 77.148958°E
- Pusa (普萨村)
- Nu'er'abati (努尔阿巴提村)
- Yusaisi (玉赛斯村) 37.235645°N 76.738717°E
- Ta'er'agezi (塔尔阿格孜村) 37.342652°N 76.712765°E
- Guosasi (果萨斯村) 37.36846°N 76.750988°E
- Aqikebailedu'er (阿其克拜勒都尔村) 37.300449°N 76.823194°E
- Kalayoulegun (喀拉尤勒滚村) 37.351824°N 76.909504°E
- Momuke (莫木克村) 37.367275°N 76.948913°E
- Dunzila (墩孜拉村) 37.470185°N 77.016502°E
- Yusilüshi (玉斯吕什村) 37.505111°N 77.049218°E
- Halasitan (哈拉斯坦村)
- Igizya (Yigeziya; ئىگىزيا كەنت / 依格孜亚村) 37.536328°N 77.100979°E
- Awatibage (阿瓦提巴格村) 37.544601°N 77.130776°E
- Yanbuke (颜布克村) 37.561903°N 77.144053°E
- Muchang (牧场村)

As of 2009, there were seventeen villages in Kokyar:

- Ying'awati (英阿瓦提村), Kekeya (柯克亚村), Outunsu (欧吞苏村), Pusa (普萨村), Akmeqit / Akemeiqite (阿克美其特村) 37.108309°N 77.006252°E, Yusaisi (玉赛斯村), Ta'er'agezi (塔尔阿格孜村), Guosasi (果萨斯村), Aqikebailedu'er (阿其克拜勒都尔村), Kalayoulegun (喀拉尤勒滚村), Momuke (莫木克村), Dunzila (墩孜拉村), Yusilüshi (玉斯吕什村), Amanxia (阿曼夏村) 37.521029°N 77.076725°E, Yigeziya (依格孜亚村), Awatibage (阿瓦提巴格村), Yanbuke (颜布克村)

== Demographics ==
Historical population
Year	Pop.	±% p.a.
2000	17,785	—
2010	19,451	+0.90%

As of 1997, 96.9% of the residents of Kokyar Township were Uyghur.

Some Mountain Tajiks (China) live in Kokyar Township.

== Economy ==
There are orchards containing apricot, mulberry and other fruit trees and fields of wheat and oats and stands of willow and poplar trees. The people produce excellent felts which are famous throughout Turkestan which obviously contribute significantly to the economy. The people speak 'Taghlik' or "hill Turki" (Uyghur). There are many long-lived trees in the area.

As of 2015, persons engaged in agriculture made up 93.1% of the population of the township and there was 16,800 mu of arable land.

Kokyar (Kekeya) Oil and Gas Field was discovered in the 1970s.

== Transportation ==
- China National Highway 219

== Historical maps ==
Historical English-language maps including Kokyar:

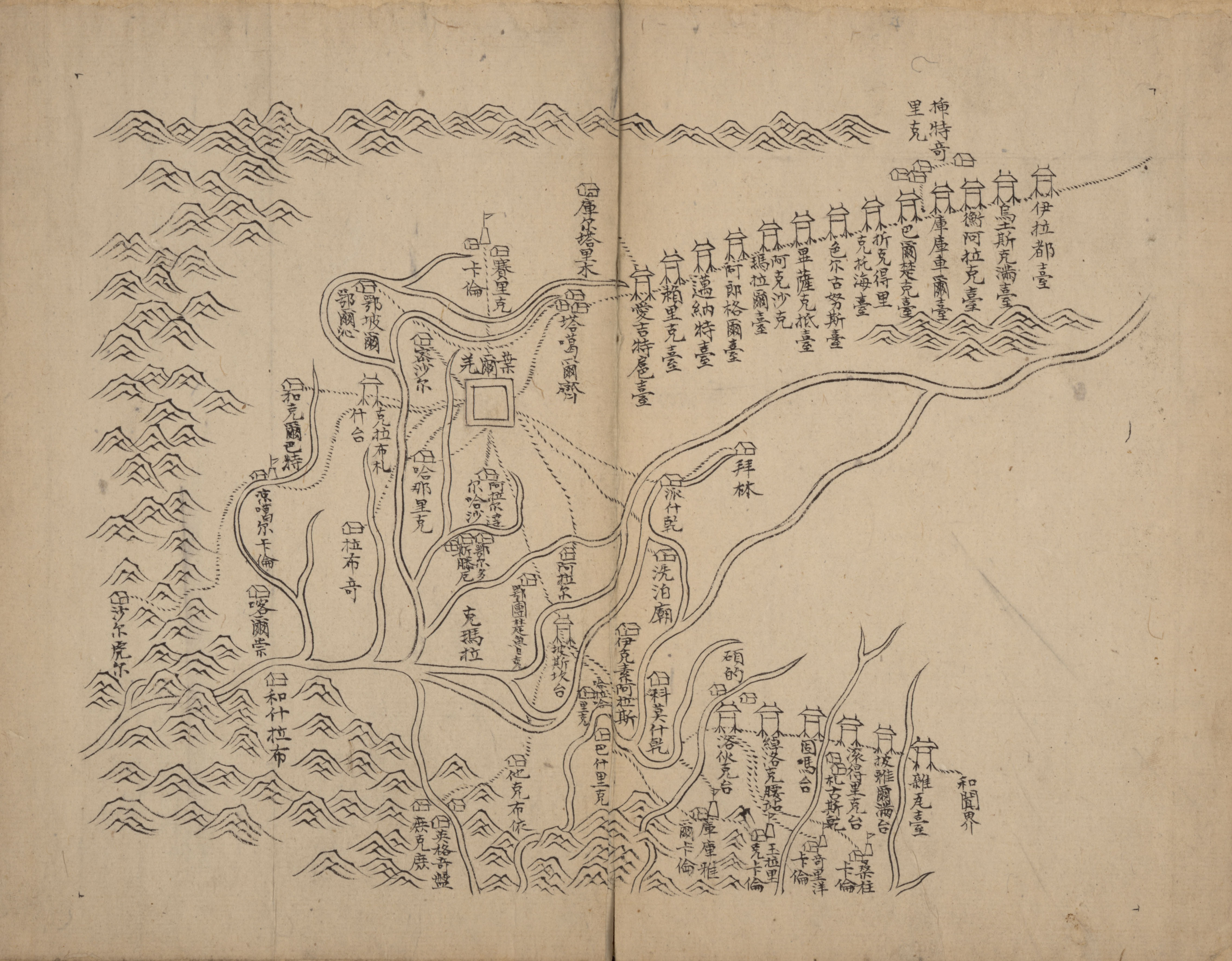
Map including Kokyar (labeled as 庫庫雅) (c. 1759)

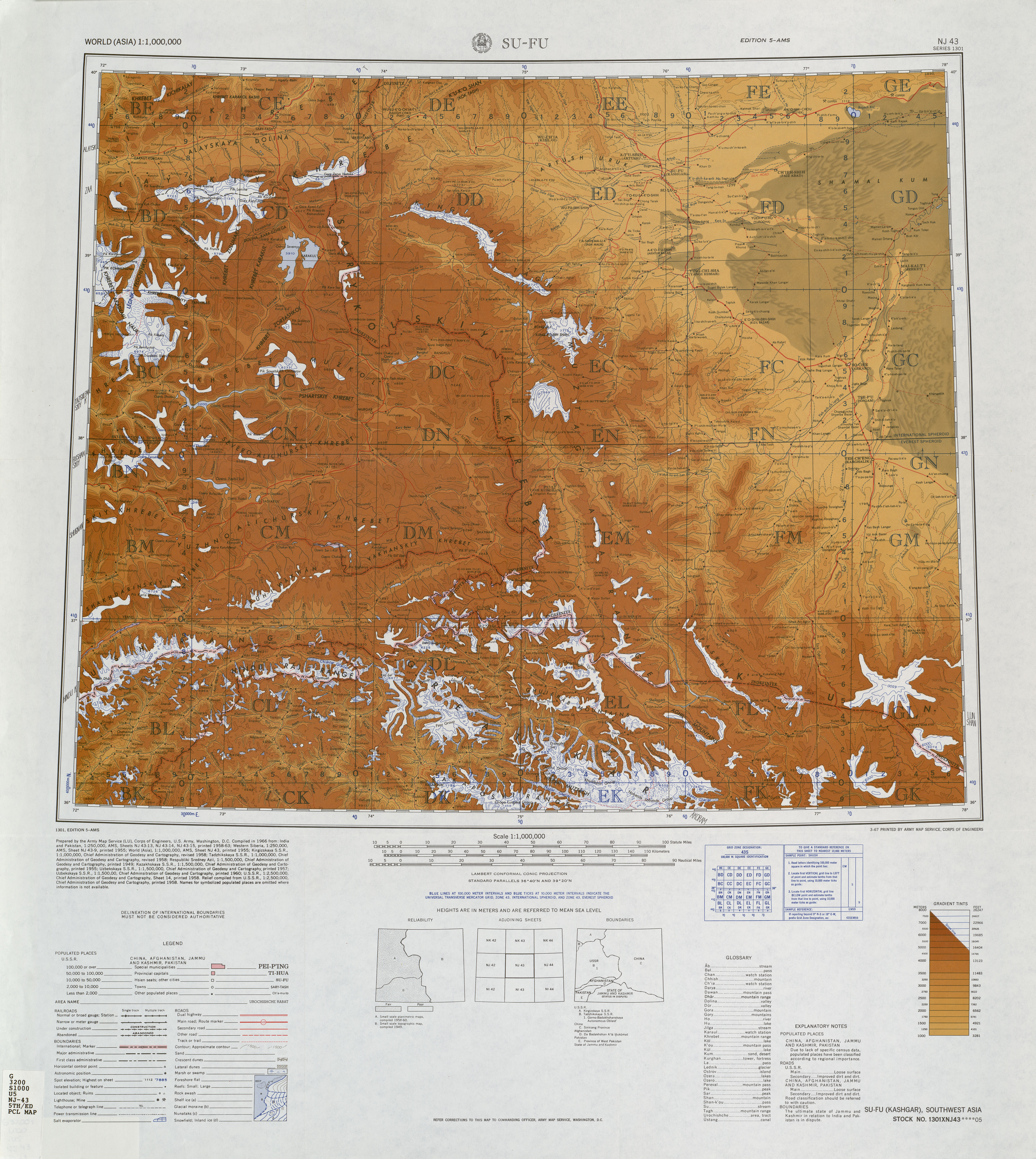
Map including Kokyar (labeled as K'u-k'u-ya) from the International Map of the World (AMS, 1966) (Note: From map: "DELINEATION OF INTERNATIONAL BOUNDARIES MUST NOT BE CONSIDERED AUTHORITATIVE")

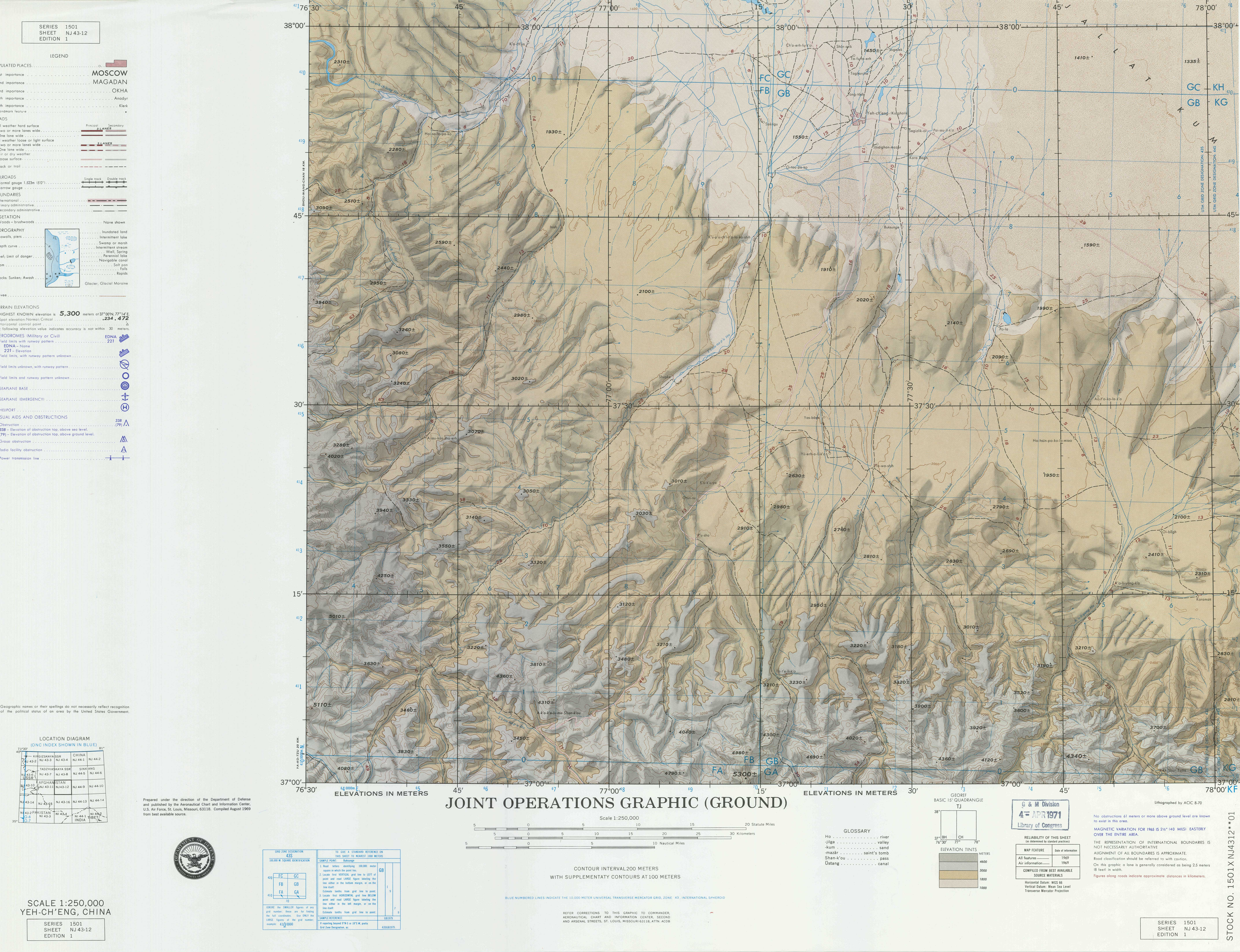
Map including Kokyar (labeled as K'u-k'u-ya) (ACIC, 1969)

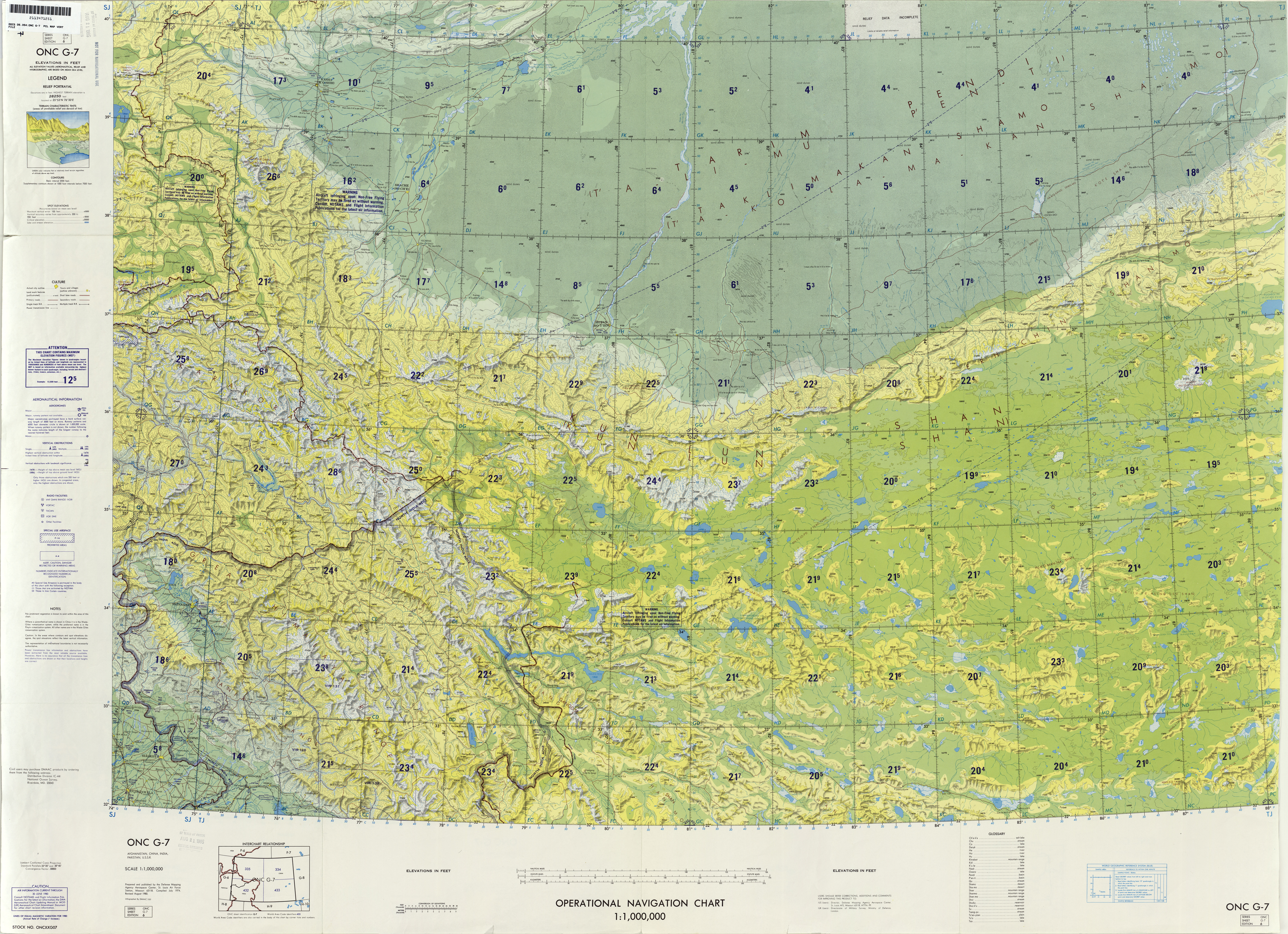
From the Operational Navigation Chart; map including Kokyar (K'u-k'o-ya) (DMA, 1980) (Note: From map: "The representation of international boundaries is not necessarily authoritative.")

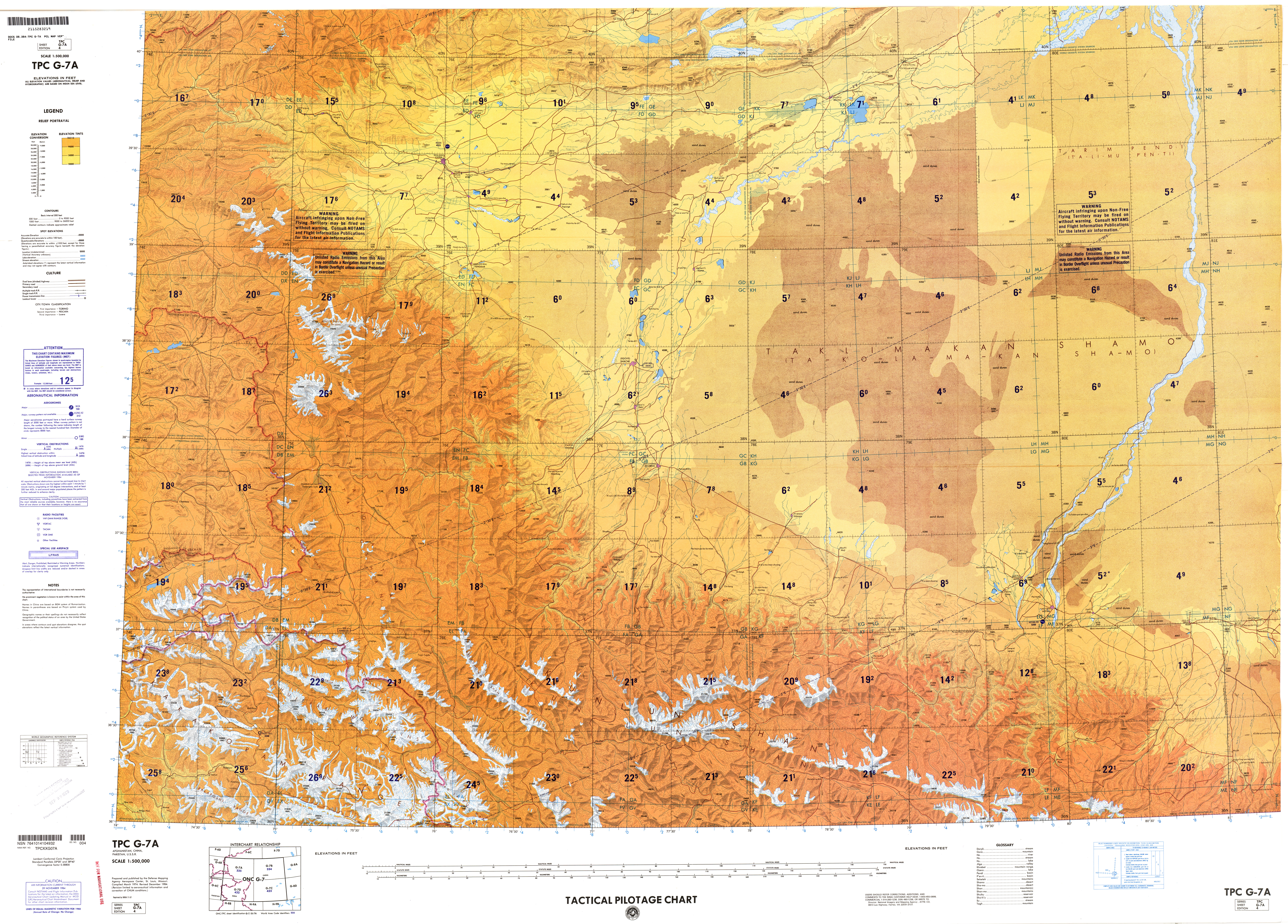
Map including Kokyar (K'u-k'o-ya) (DMA, 1984) (Note: From map: "The representation of international boundaries is not necessarily authoritative")

== See also ==
- List of township-level divisions of Xinjiang
