= Bazar Dara =

Coordinates: 36.3995°N 76.8051°E

Bazar Dara (Bāzār Darra, Tágh Nák, Tokanak or Maza Dala) was a small mining community at the junction of the Bazar Dara and Yarkand Rivers south of the Kunlun Mountains in the Xinjiang region of China, bordering on the Taklamakan Desert.

'Dara' means 'cliff' in the Uyghur language. Bazar Dara can, therefore, be translated, 'Cliff Bazaar' or 'Cliff Market,' an apt description of this ancient settlement. It is 139 km west of Shahidulla, and 25 km west of modern Mazar (Chinese: Mazha 麻扎), which name simply indicates the shrine of a Muslim holy man.

"The name of this kingdom is written Deruo [or Dere] 得若 in the Tangshu (ch. CCXXI, a, p. 9b) and Yiruo 億若 in the Weilüe. . . ." Translated and adapted from Édouard Chavannes: "Les pays d’Occident d’après le Heou Han chou." T’oung pao 8, (1907), p. 175, n. 2.

== Geography ==
Filippo De Filippi, who visited Bazar Dara, described a fort, the ruins of a market for horses and cattle, an extensive bazaar and a long line of ruins of mine shafts and houses along the cliff faces abandoned by goldminers after bandit raids approximately a century before his expedition in 1914.

Bazar Darra was of both strategic and economic importance. It was located at the junction of the route via the Shimshal Valley to Hunza or south over the Mustagh Pass to Skardu, or west to Shahidulla, and was the centre for a number of goldmines. It also joined the main winter route which led directly north along the frozen Yarkand River to Yecheng via Kokyar, and from there, the route went northwest via Kokyar to Yarkand (Yarkant County) and Kashgar, or northeast to Pishan Town and Hotan,

== History ==
The site of Bazar Dara, almost unknown today, has been known to the Chinese for about 2000 years. It was almost certainly the site of the ancient 'Kingdom of Dere' 德若 mentioned in the Hou Hanshu.

In 1535 CE, a group of Muslim soldiers trapped at Shey in Ladakh, fled through here on their way to the Wakhan Corridor and the safety of Badakshan.

In 1898 an expedition led by Captain H. P. P. Deasy found an outpost built of earth at Bazar Dara, surmounted by a Chinese flag, with a few unarmed Kirghiz in occupation. This was obviously intended as a Chinese boundary marker, but the area had apparently long been under occupation by Kanjuts.
