= China National Highway 219 =

Road in China along the western and southern border

National Highway 219
- 219国道
- Planned extension of the G219

Route information
- Length: 10,000 km (6,200 mi) 2,342 km (1,455 mi) until 2013. Proposed length is over 10,000 km (6,214 mi), according to a 2013–2030 government plan
- Existed: 1955–present

Major junctions
- north-west end: Kom-Kanas Mongolian Ethnic Township
- south-east end: Dongxing

Location
- Country: China

Highway system
- National Trunk Highway System; Primary; Auxiliary
← G218	→ G220

China National Highway 219 (G219; Chinese: Guódào219) is a highway running along the entire western and southern border of the People's Republic of China, from Kom-Kanas in Xinjiang to Dongxing in Guangxi. At over 10,000 kilometres (6,214 mi) in length, it is part of the China National Highway Network Planning (2013–2030), and once completed it will be the longest National Highway.

Before 2013, G219 ran only from Yecheng (Karghilik) in the Xinjiang to Lhatse in Tibet on a length of 2,342 km (1,455 mi). This section was completed in September 1957. India is engaged in a territorial dispute with China over Aksai Chin, through which this section passes for 180 km (112 mi). After a 1962 war, China retained control of the road.

For the first time after the 1960s, between 2010-2012, China spent CN¥3 Billion ($476 million) repaving the Xinjiang section spanning just over 650 km (404 mi). China's 13th (2016–2020) and 14th (2021–2025) five-year plans both included development of the road and connectivity with other roads.

== Original G219 ==
Construction of the Sinkiang-Tibet road as a gravel road was started in 1951. It is also known as the 'Yehchang–Gartok road', the 'Aksai Chin road', and the 'Sky Road'. As the only direct road between Xinjiang and Tibet it is of strategic importance to China.

=== Aksai Chin ===
Alignment of the 1957 Xinjiang-Tibet road.

Through the 1950s, China constructed the road through its western frontier in Xinjiang and Tibet, from Hotan to Rutog. It was completed in September 1957.

About 180 km (112 mi) passes through Aksai Chin, easily accessible to the Chinese, but more difficult for the Indians on the other side of the Karakoram to reach. India did not learn of the road until 1957. Both sides lay claim to the area.

The road enters disputed territory east of Sarigh Jilgnang after which it runs through territory India recognizes as its own. India claimed the road to be in contravention to the Sino-Indian Agreement 1954. China repaved the road in the following years, which resulted in heightened tension. A goal of the 1962 war was the defence of the road. China retained control of the road, taking even more territory further west before withdrawing. There is a Chinese war memorial on the G219 at Kangxiwar.

Dispute over the territory persists to the present time. A number of lateral roads, including to military infrastructure, have been constructed.

== Extension ==
Repaving of the existing road began in late 2010. By July 2012 and with an expenditure of CN¥3 Billion ($476 million), the Xinjiang section spanning just over 650 km (404 mi) was completed. This was the first repaving since the 1960s, according to a Chinese road administration official. The 13th five-year plan (2016–2020) facilitated further upgrades to the road. In 2013, the road was upgraded to asphalt. A number of provincial roads have been and are being developed to exit off the G219: the G564 and the G365, as well as the S205, S206 and S207. China's 14th five-year plan for 2021–2025 envisions further improves connectivity of the G219.

=== Route description ===
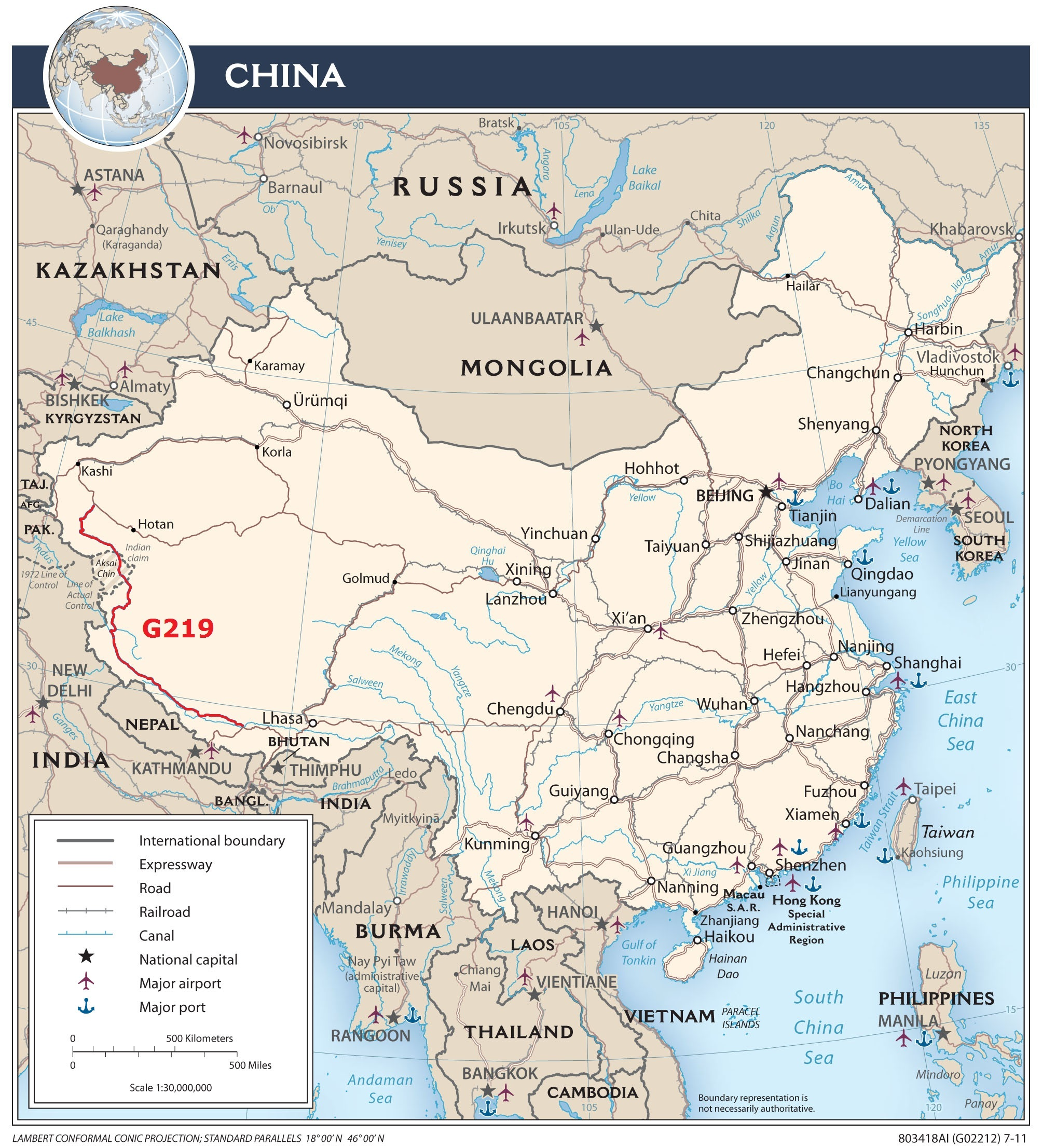
G219 in 2011

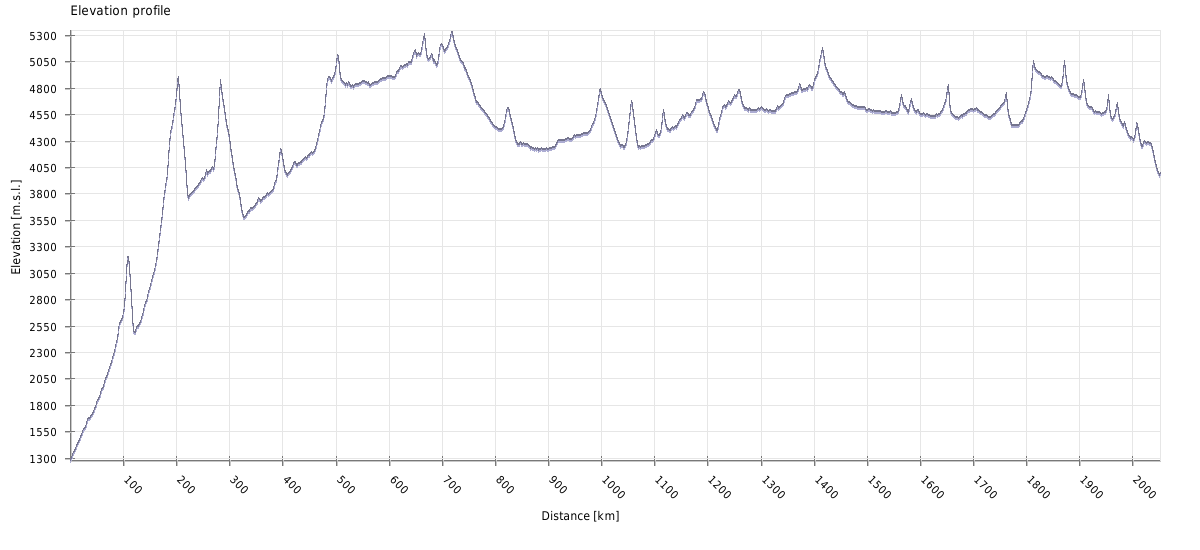
G219 elevation profile; Xinjiang line

As one of the highest motorable roads in the world, the scenery of Rutog County also ranks as some of the most inhospitable terrain on the planet. Domar township—a town of concrete blocks and nomad tents—is one of the most remote outposts of the People's Liberation Army at the edge of the Aksai Chin. Near the town of Mazar many trekkers turn off for both the Karakorum range and K2 base camp. Approaching the Xinjiang border, past the final Tibetan settlement of Tserang Daban, is a dangerous 5,050-meter-high pass. Tibetan nomads in the area herd both yaks and two-humped camels. Descending through the western Kunlun Shan, the road crosses additional passes of 4,000 and 3,000 meters, and the final pass offers views of the Taklamakan Desert far below, before descending into the Karakax River basin.

The Chinese government is making efforts to promote tourism along G219. There are a number of military check posts along the road.

=== Route and distance ===
Map

Province	Prefecture	County	Township/Village/Landmark	Coord	km (mi)
Xinjiang	Kashgar	Kargilik (Yecheng)	Boxireke-xiang (zh)	37.876°N 77.466°E	0
Xinjiang	Kashgar	Kargilik (Yecheng)	Kokyar	37.394°N 77.183°E	65 km (40 mi)
Xinjiang	Kashgar	Kargilik (Yecheng)	Pusa	37.317°N 77.145°E	10 km (6 mi)
Xinjiang	Kashgar	Kargilik (Yecheng)	Akemei	37.111°N 77.010°E	28 km (17 mi)
Xinjiang	Kashgar	Kargilik (Yecheng)	K104 military rest point	37.092°N 76.966°E	6 km (4 mi)
Xinjiang	Kashgar	Kargilik (Yecheng)	Akazi	37.073°N 76.879°E	20 km (12 mi)
Xinjiang	Kashgar	Kargilik (Yecheng)	Kudi	36.837°N 76.981°E	33 km (21 mi)
Xinjiang	Kashgar	Kargilik (Yecheng)	Mazar Pass	36.579°N 77.003°E	58 km (36 mi)
Xinjiang	Kashgar	Kargilik (Yecheng)	Kirgizjangal Pass	36.404°N 77.487°E	88 km (55 mi)
Xinjiang	Hotan	Pishan	Xaidulla	36.352°N 78.027°E	55 km (34 mi)
Xinjiang	Hotan	Hotan	Dahongliutan	35.982°N 79.188°E	122 km (76 mi)
Xinjiang Aksai Chin*	Hotan	Hotan	Entering disputed area	35.927°N 79.269°E	10 km (6 mi)
Xinjiang Aksai Chin*	Hotan	Hotan	Tianshuihai	35.297°N 79.561°E	102 km (63 mi)
Xinjiang Aksai Chin*	Hotan	Hotan	Leaving disputed area	34.785°N 80.101°E	85 km (53 mi)
			Border between Xinjiang Uyghur AR and Tibet AR	34.785°N 80.101°E	85 km (53 mi)
Tibet	Ngari	Rutog	Risong	33.383°N 79.729°E	265 km (165 mi)
Tibet	Ngari	Gar	Sengge Zangbo bridge	32.500°N 80.092°E	125 km (78 mi)
Tibet	Shigatse	Zhongba	Labrang	29.768°N 84.032°E	580 km (360 mi)
Tibet	Shigatse	Saga	Gya'gya	29.331°N 85.230°E	162 km (101 mi)
Tibet	Shigatse	Ngamring	Gegang	29.273°N 87.182°E	241 km (150 mi)
Tibet	Shigatse	Lhatse	Chawu-xiang (zh)	29.109°N 87.582°E	52 km (32 mi)
Total					2,107 km (1,309 mi)

=== Mountain Passes Rhyme ===
The western portion of the highway has numerous notable mountain passes. Motorists have invented a rhyme describing those mountain passes:

(optional preamble)
行车新藏线，不亚蜀道难。

库地达坂险，犹似鬼门关；
麻扎达坂尖，陡升五千三；
黑卡达坂旋，九十九道弯；
界山达坂弯，喘气真是难。

(alternate to last line)
界山达坂弯，伸手可摸天。

(optional preamble)
Driving the Xinjiang-Tibet road, no easier than the ancient roads to Sichuan.

Kudi Daban is very dangerous, just like the gates of hell;
Mazar Daban is very pointy, soaring five thousand and three;
Heiqia Daban is very loopy, with ninety-nine bends in the road;
Jieshan Daban is very curvy, but breathing now is really hard.

(alternate to last line)
Jieshan Daban is very curvy, an extended hand will touch the sky.

=== Gallery ===
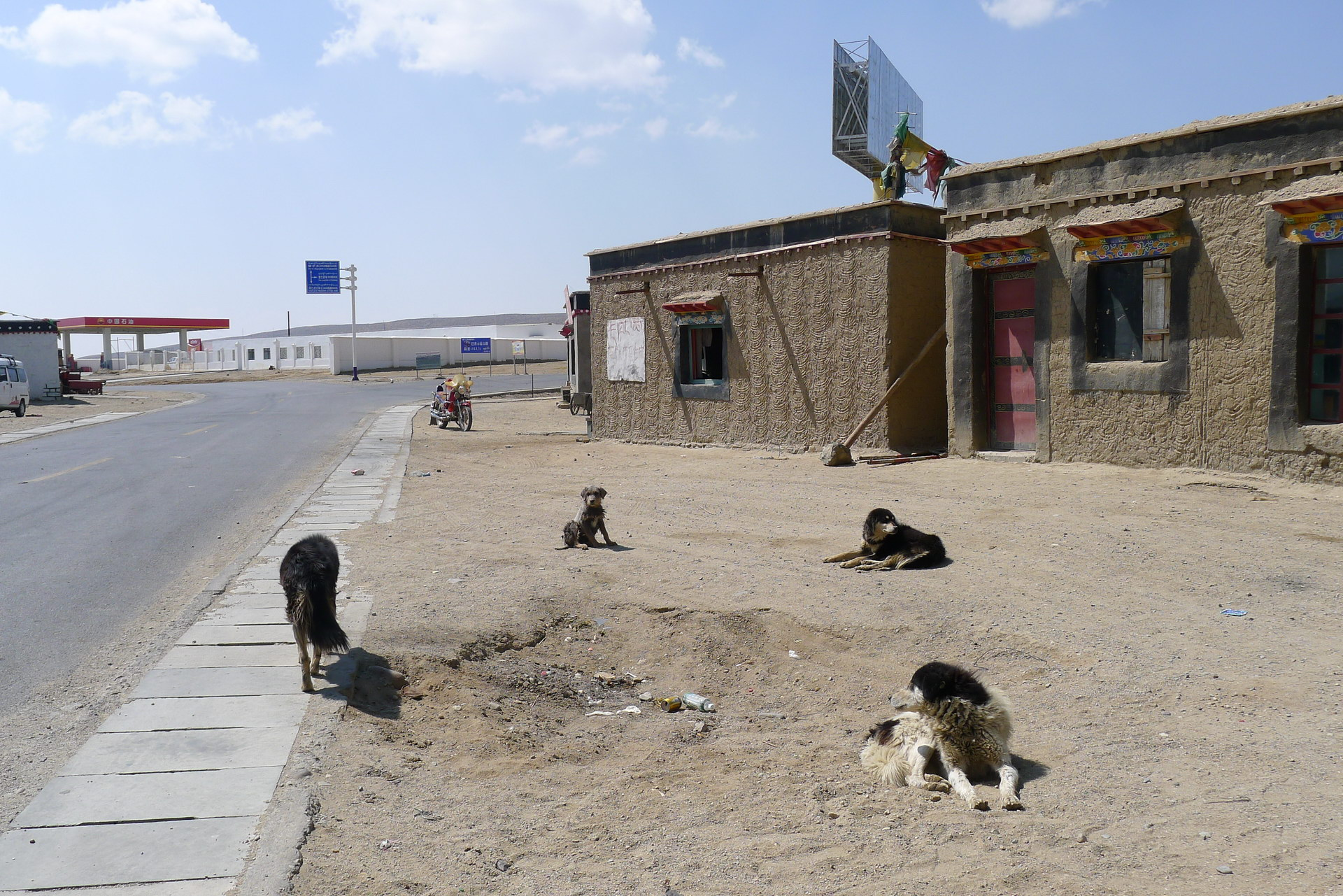
G219 in Barga Township, Tibet

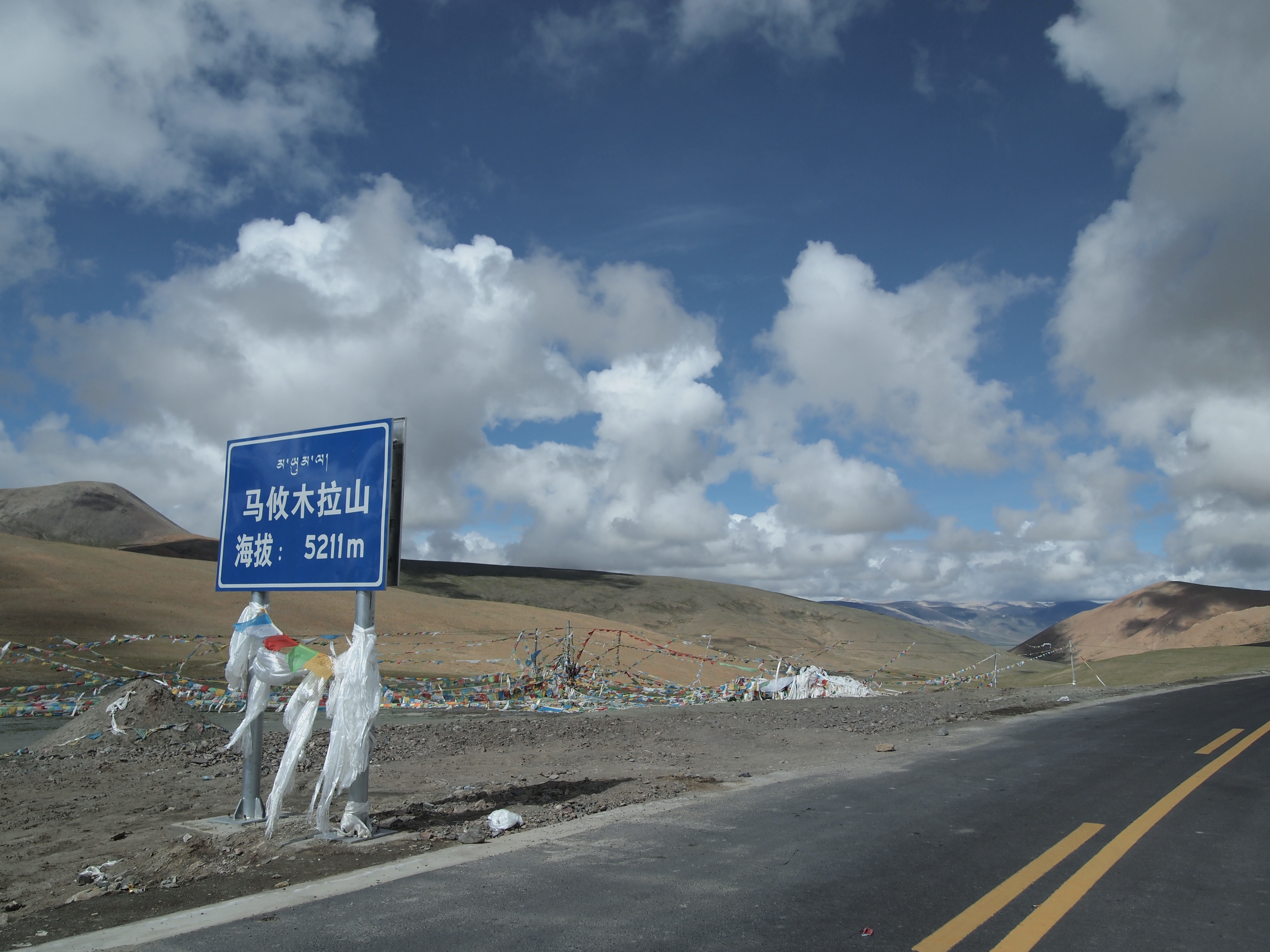
G219 in Burang, Tibet

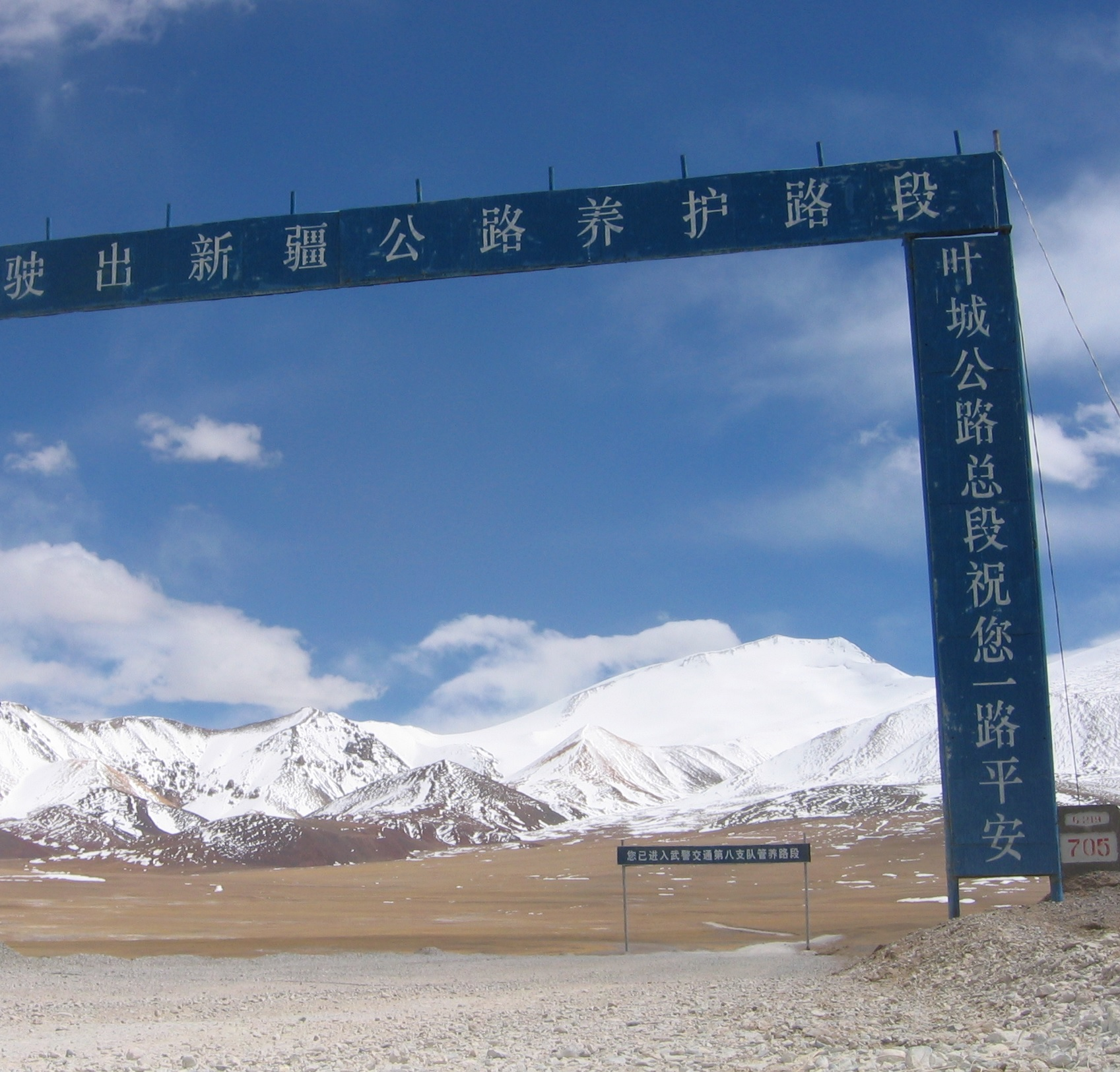
Few kilometers south of the border between Xinjiang and Tibet on the G219.

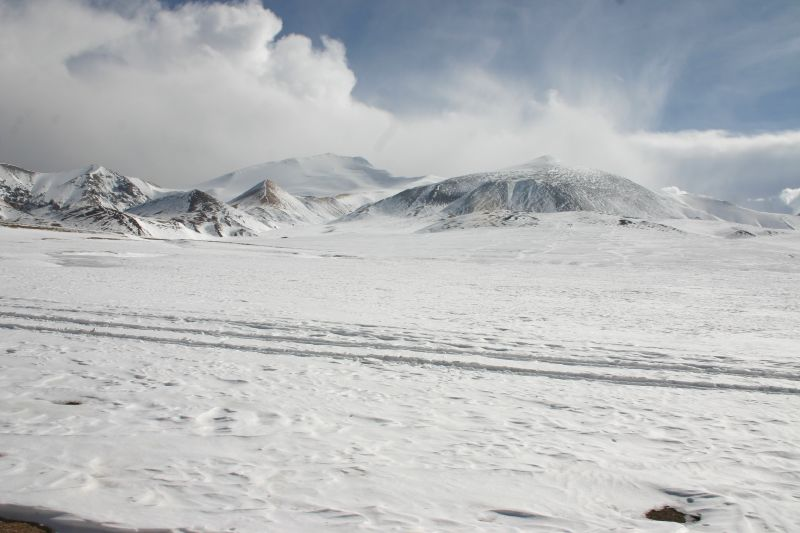
Same mountains as previous image but closer

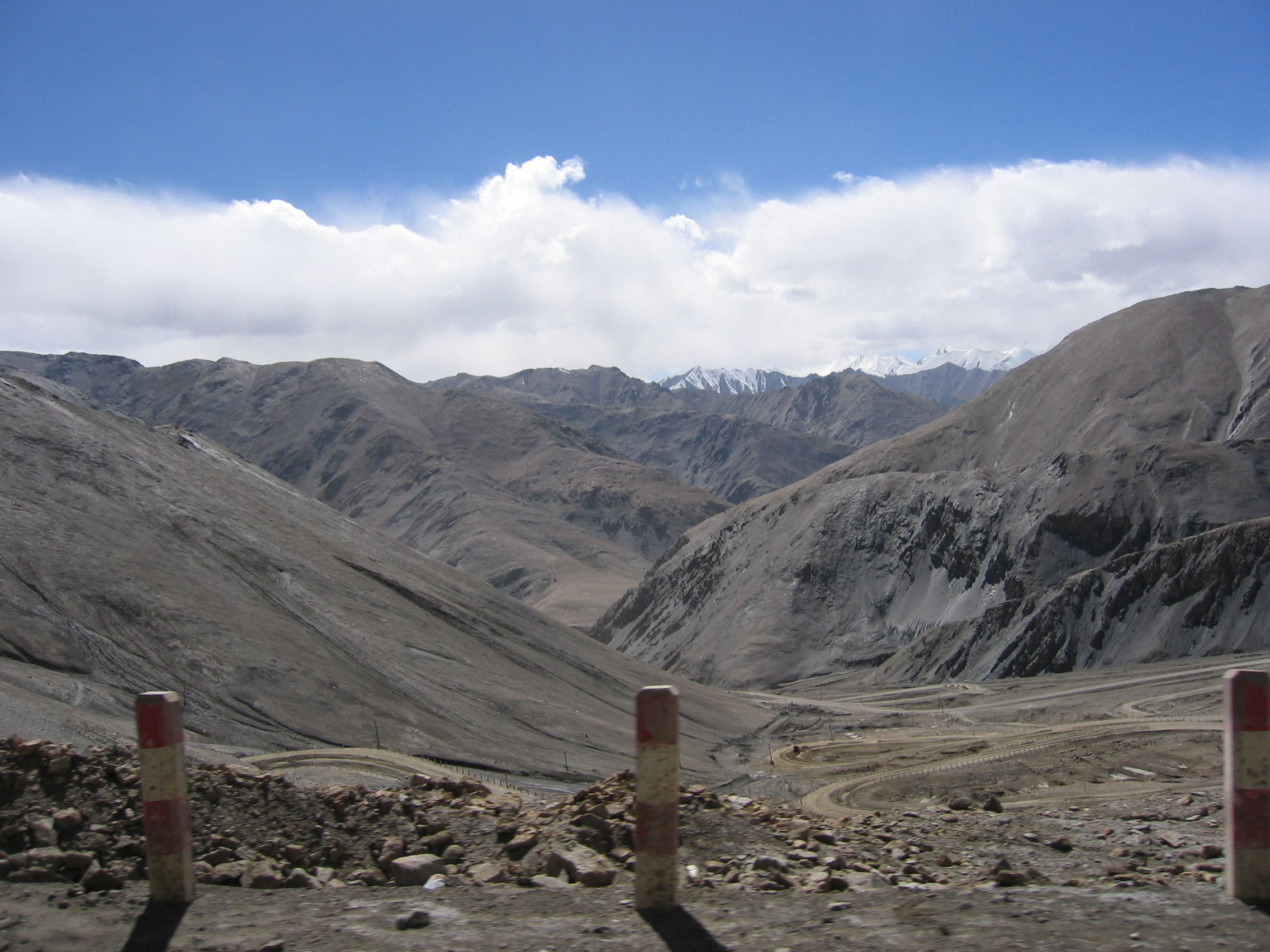
Heiqiazi Daban (Kirgizjangal Pass) in Kargilik County, Xinjiang

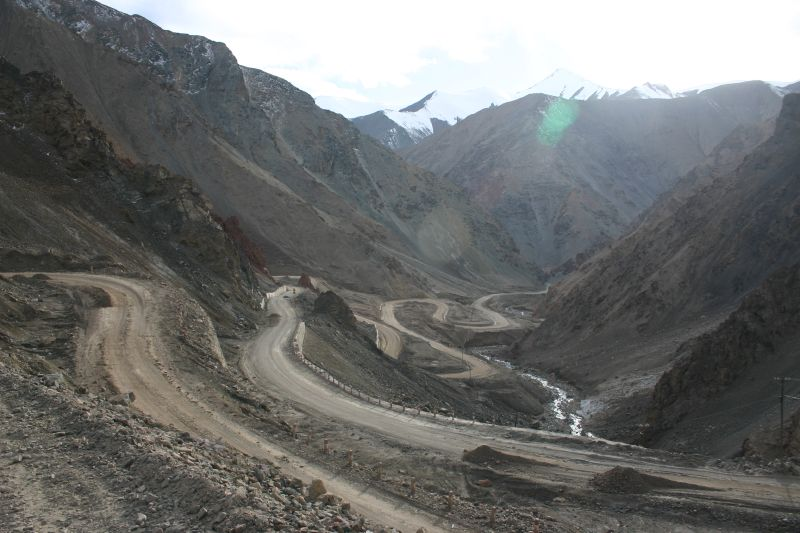
Mazar Pass (Chiragsaldi Pass) in Kargilik County, Xinjiang

== New route ==
The route was expanded in the China National Highway Network Planning (2013–2030) both northward and eastward to span the entire Chinese western and southern border. The new route will measure over 10,000 km (6,214 mi), making it by far the longest National Highway.

The section along the China-Vietnam border is also known as the Yanbian Highway (沿边公路, literally: along the border highway).

=== Route table ===
G219 on OpenStreetMap

Province	Place	Distance
Xinjiang	Kom-Kanas	
Xinjiang	Habahe/Kaba	
Xinjiang	Jeminay County	
Xinjiang	Hoboksar	
Xinjiang	Yumin	
Xinjiang	Bole	
Xinjiang	Wenquan/Arixang	
Xinjiang	Zhaosu	
Xinjiang	Onsu	
Xinjiang	Uqturpan	
Xinjiang	Akqi	
Xinjiang	Peyziwat	
Xinjiang	Yopurgha	
Xinjiang	Yengisar	
Xinjiang	Yarkant	
Xinjiang	Poskam	
Xinjiang	Kargilik	
Tibet	Rutog	
Tibet	Gar	
Tibet	Zhongba	
Tibet	Saga	
Tibet	Gyirong	
Tibet	Tingri	
Tibet	Dinggyê	
Tibet	Gamba	
Tibet	Lhozhag	
Tibet	Comai	
Tibet	Lhünzê	
Tibet	Mainling	
Tibet	Mêdog	
Tibet	Zayü	
Yunnan	Gongshan	
Yunnan	Fugong	
Yunnan	Lushui	
Yunnan	Tengchong	
Yunnan	Longling	
Yunnan	Yongde	
Yunnan	Zhenkang	
Yunnan	Cangyuan	
Yunnan	Ximeng	
Yunnan	Menglian	
Yunnan	Lancang	
Yunnan	Menghai	
Yunnan	Jinghong	
Yunnan	Jiangcheng	
Yunnan	Lüchun	
Yunnan	Jinping	
Yunnan	Pingbian	
Yunnan	Maguan	
Yunnan	Xichou	
Guangxi	Pingxiang	
Guangxi	Dongxing	

== See also ==
- China National Highways
- China National Highway 228, which follows the coastline of China
- China National Highway 331, which follows the northern border of China
