= Sangchu =

Sangchu or sang-chu may refer to:

- Xiahe County (Tibetan THL transcription: Sangchu), a county in Gansu, China
- Sanju Pass (Wade–Giles: Sang^{1}-chu^{1} ku^{3}-tao^{4}), a mountain pass in Xinjiang, China
- Sangchu (singer) (born 1982), South Korean singer, member of Mighty Mouth
- Ri Sang-chu, North Korean politician returned to the Supreme People's Assembly in the 2003 North Korean parliamentary election
- Sang-chu, a minor character in the 2014 South Korean television series Gunman in Joseon
