= Yecheng =

Yecheng may refer to:

- Kargilik County, or Yecheng County (葉城), Kashgar Prefecture, Xinjiang, China
  - Kargilik Town, or Yecheng Town, seat of Kargilik County
- Ye (Hebei), or Yecheng (鄴城)

== See also ==
- Ye County, Henan
- Ye County, Shandong
