= Shahidulla =

Village in Xinjiang, China

Shahidulla شەيدۇللا Xaidulla, Saitula
- Historic village and campground
- Etymology: witness or martyr of Allah
- Nickname: Sanshili Yingfang
- Location within Southern Xinjiang
- Coordinates: 36.4140°N 77.9875°E
- Country: China
- Autonomous Region: Xinjiang
- Prefecture: Hotan
- County: Hekang
- Elevation: 3,646 m (11,962 ft)

Shahidulla

Chinese name
- Traditional Chinese: 賽圖拉
- Simplified Chinese: 赛图拉
Transcriptions
Standard Mandarin
- Hanyu Pinyin: Sàitúlā
- Wade–Giles: Sai^{4}-t'u^{2}-la^{1}

Alternative Chinese name
- Traditional Chinese: 三十里營房
- Simplified Chinese: 三十里营房
Transcriptions
Standard Mandarin
- Hanyu Pinyin: Sānshílǐ Yíngfáng

Uyghur name
- Uyghur: شەيدۇللا
Transcriptions
- Latin Yëziqi: Shahidulla
- Siril Yëziqi: Шаһидулла

Shahidulla, (Note: Alternative spellings: Shahidullah and Shahidula.) also spelt Xaidulla, (altitude ca. 3,646 m or 11,962 ft), was a nomad camping ground and historical caravan halting place in the Karakash River valley, close to Khotan, in the southwestern part of Xinjiang Autonomous Region, China. The site contains the ruins of a historical fort which was demolished by the Chinese administration of Xinjiang between 1890 and 1892. The site lies next to the Chinese National Highway G219 between Kashgar and Tibet, 25 km east of Mazar and 115 km west of Dahongliutan.

The modern town of Saitula (Xeyidula) is located next to the old fort of Suget Karaul built by the Qing administration (of China) about 10 km (30 "Chinese miles") southeast of the original site. A modern People's Liberation Army barracks named Sanshili Yingfang or Sanshili Barracks (lit. '30 li barracks') is also located here. "Sanshili Barracks" is a more common name used by motorists along the G219 highway.

== Etymology ==
The Uyghur name Shahidulla simply means "witness of Allah" or "martyr of Allah" depending on the interpretation of the heteronym "shahid".

During the 1800s, the place was a sepulcher or shrine for a person known as Shahidulla Khoja, or Shahid Ullah Khajeh. He was said to be a Khoja from Yarkand who was killed by "his Khitay pursuers" during the 1700s Qing conquest of Xinjiang. His real name is lost to history. Kirghiz nomads at the locale venerated the shrine and Muslim travellers, in particular Central Asian pilgrims to Mecca who regularly traversed this route, would pray for blessings at the shrine on their journey.

== Geography and caravan trade ==
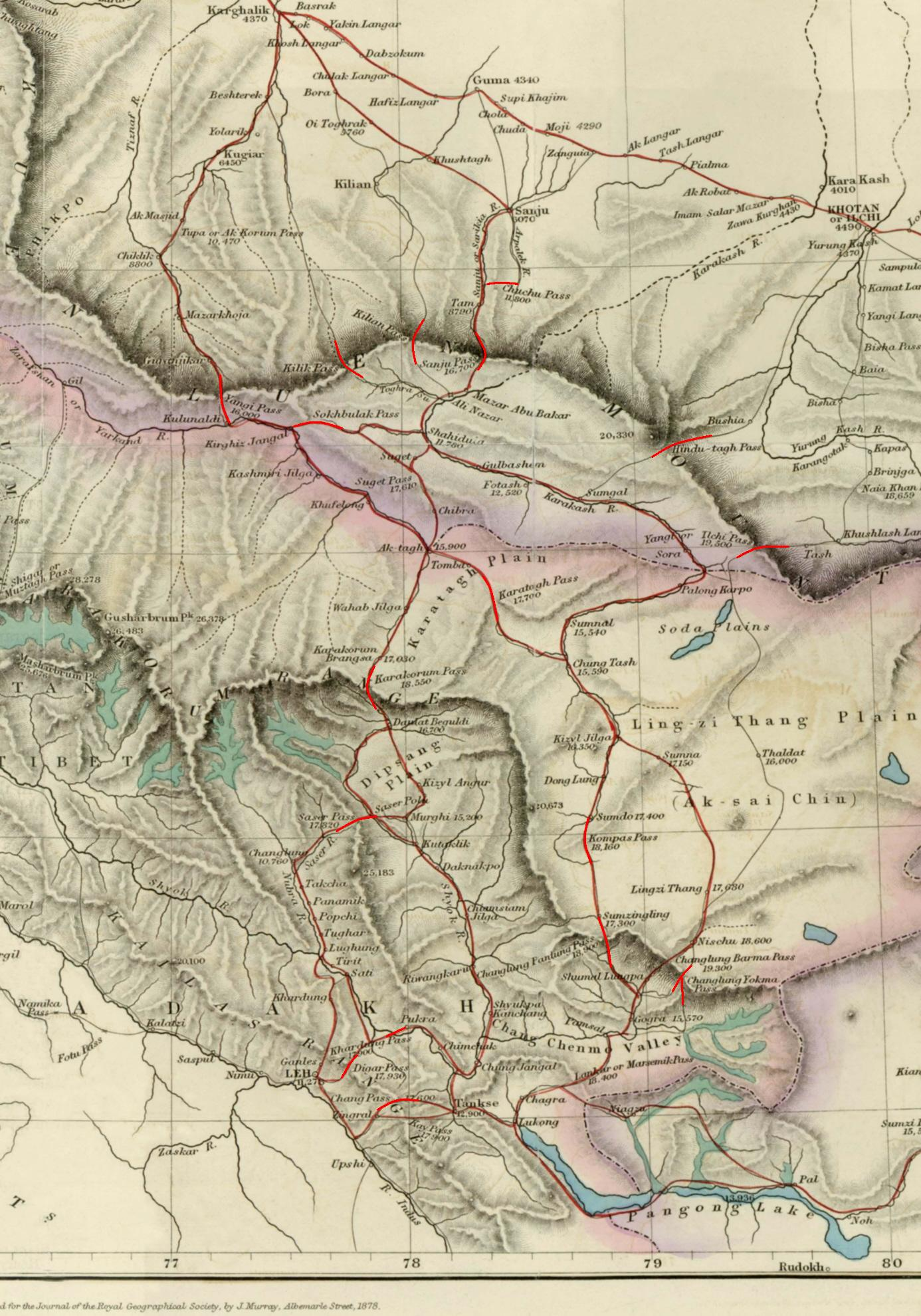
Map 1: 19th century trade routes through Shahidulla (located in the centre of the map, near the western bend of the Karakash River). The bold lines represent the Karakoram range in the south and the "northern branch" of the Kunlun Mountains in the north. The "southern branch" of the Kunlun mountains is unmarked. (Map not drawn to scale)

Shahidulla is situated between the Kunlun Mountains and the Karakoram range, "close to the southern foot of the former". It is at the western bend of the Karakash River, which originates in the Aksai Chin plains, flows northeast and makes a sharp bend to the west at the foot of the Kunlun range. After making another bend near Shahidulla, it flows northeast again, cutting through the Kunlun Mountains towards Khotan. The traditional site of Shahidulla is located northwest of the modern town, about 10 kilometres (6.2 mi) downstream.

Caravaners talk about a "southern branch" of the Kunlun range at the foot of which the Karakash flows, and a "northern branch" (also called the "Kilian range") which has various passes (from the west to east, Yangi, Kilik, Kilian, Sanju, Hindu-tagh and Ilchi passes). The Kilian (36.7046°N 77.9485°E) and Sanju (36.6702°N 78.2456°E) passes are the most often mentioned, which lead to Kashgar.

Multiple trade routes between Leh in Ladakh, India, and Central Asia passed through Shahidulla. (Map 1) The settlement provided water, grazing, fuel and rest for merchants travelling along these mountain trade routes.

To the south of Shahidulla, the main trade route passed through Suget Karaul (the site of modern 'Saitula' town), ascended the valley of a stream to the Suget Pass (36°09′33″N 78°00′32″E) and, after crossing a junction point of Ak-tagh (35°58′26″N 78°01′41″E), went over the Karakoram Pass into Ladakh. An alternative route to Ladakh from Shahidulla (called the "Chang Chenmo route") went along the Karakash river till reaching the Aksai Chin plains and then to Ladakh via the Chang Chenmo valley. This route was never really popular with the traders, despite the best efforts of the British Raj to promote it.

Kulbhushan Warikoo states that, of the two trade routes between Central Asia and the Indian subcontinent ("western route" through Chitral and the "eastern route" through Shahidulla), the eastern route was more favoured by the traders as it was relatively safe from robberies and political turmoil:

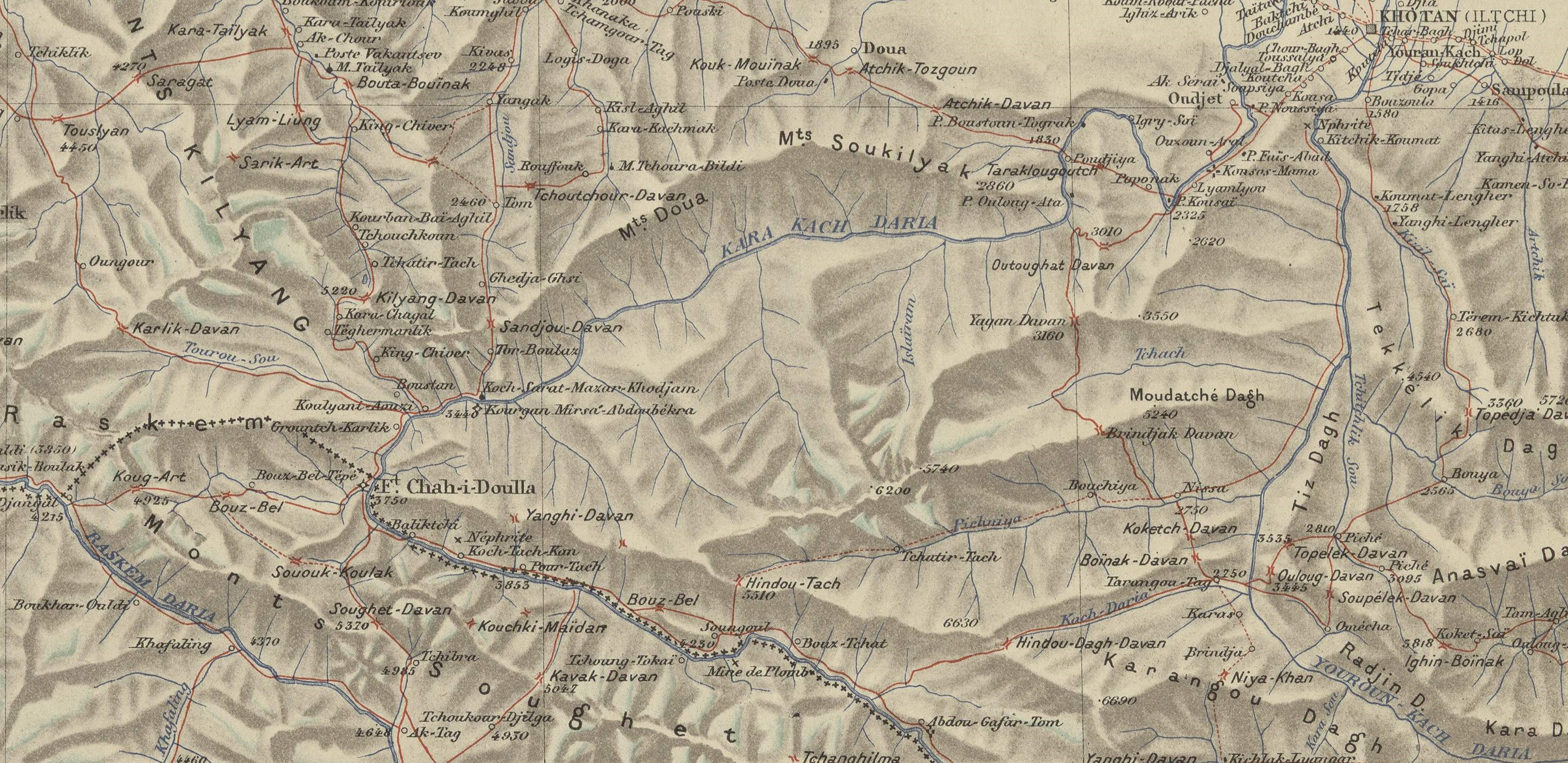
Map 2: Shahidulla ("Chah-i-Doulla") and environs, French Army map 1906.

Such was the safety of this route that in the event of unfavourable weather or death of ponies, traders would march to a safe place leaving behind their goods which were fetched after the climate became favourable or substitute transport became available.

The absence of turmoil was not a given. In fact, the traders applied pressure on the rulers to avoid conflict. The Ladakhi rulers especially heeded such warnings, dependent as they were on trade for their prosperity.

The entire area between the Karakoram range and the Kunlun Mountains is mostly uninhabited and has very little vegetation, except for the river valleys of Yarkand and Karakash. In these valleys, during the summer months, cultivation was possible. Kanjutis from Hunza used to cultivate in the Yarkand valley (called "Raskam" plots) and the Kirghiz from Turkestan used to cultivate in the area of Shahidullah. Shahidullah is described as a "seasonal township" in the sources, but it was little more than a campground in the 19th century.

== History ==
There is legendary and documentary evidence that indicates that Indians from Taxila and the Chinese were among the first settlers of Khotan. In the first century BC, Kashmir and Khotan on the two sides of the Karakoram range formed a joint kingdom, which was ruled by either Scythian or Turki (Elighur) chiefs. Towards the end of the first century AD, the kingdom broke up into two parts: Khotan being annexed by the Chinese and Kashmir by Kanishka.

Some modern scholars believe the Kingdom of Zihe (Chinese: 子合; Wade–Giles: Tzu-ho) in Chinese historical records was situated at Shahidulla. This is not universally attested.

=== 16th century ===
In late 15th century, Mirza Abu Bakr Dughlat from the Dughlat tribe founded an independent kingdom for himself from the fragmentation of Moghulistan. The kingdom encompassed Khotan and Kashgar. However, he was deposed in the 1510s by Sultan Said Khan who founded the Yarkand Khanate. While attempting to flee to Ladakh, Abu Bakr was intercepted and killed. His tomb is located about 30 kilometres (20 miles) north of modern-day town of Xaidulla.

=== 19th century ===
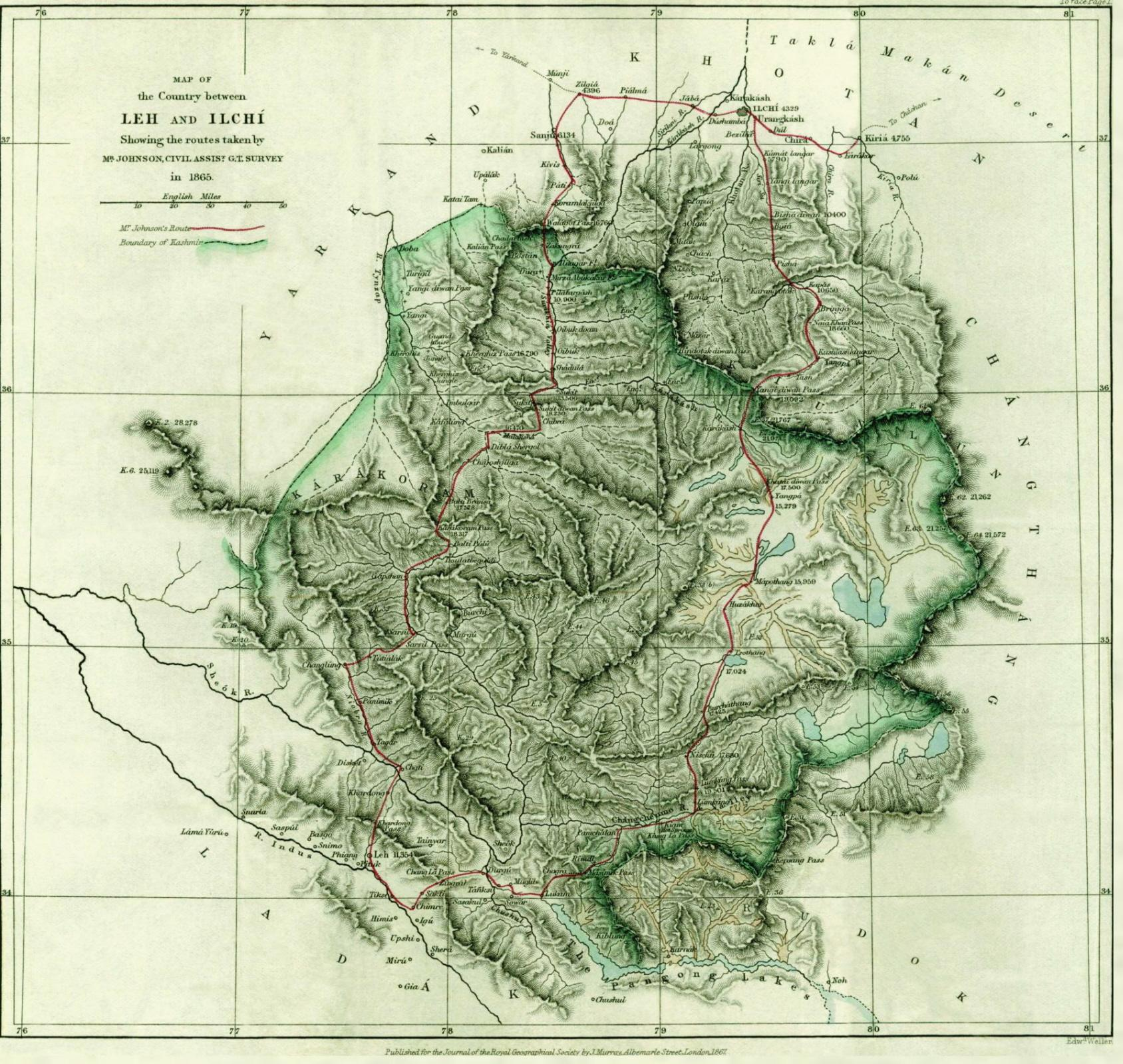
Map 3: W. H. Johnson's map of the territory of Ladakh (1865); Johnson's route to Khotan and back marked in red

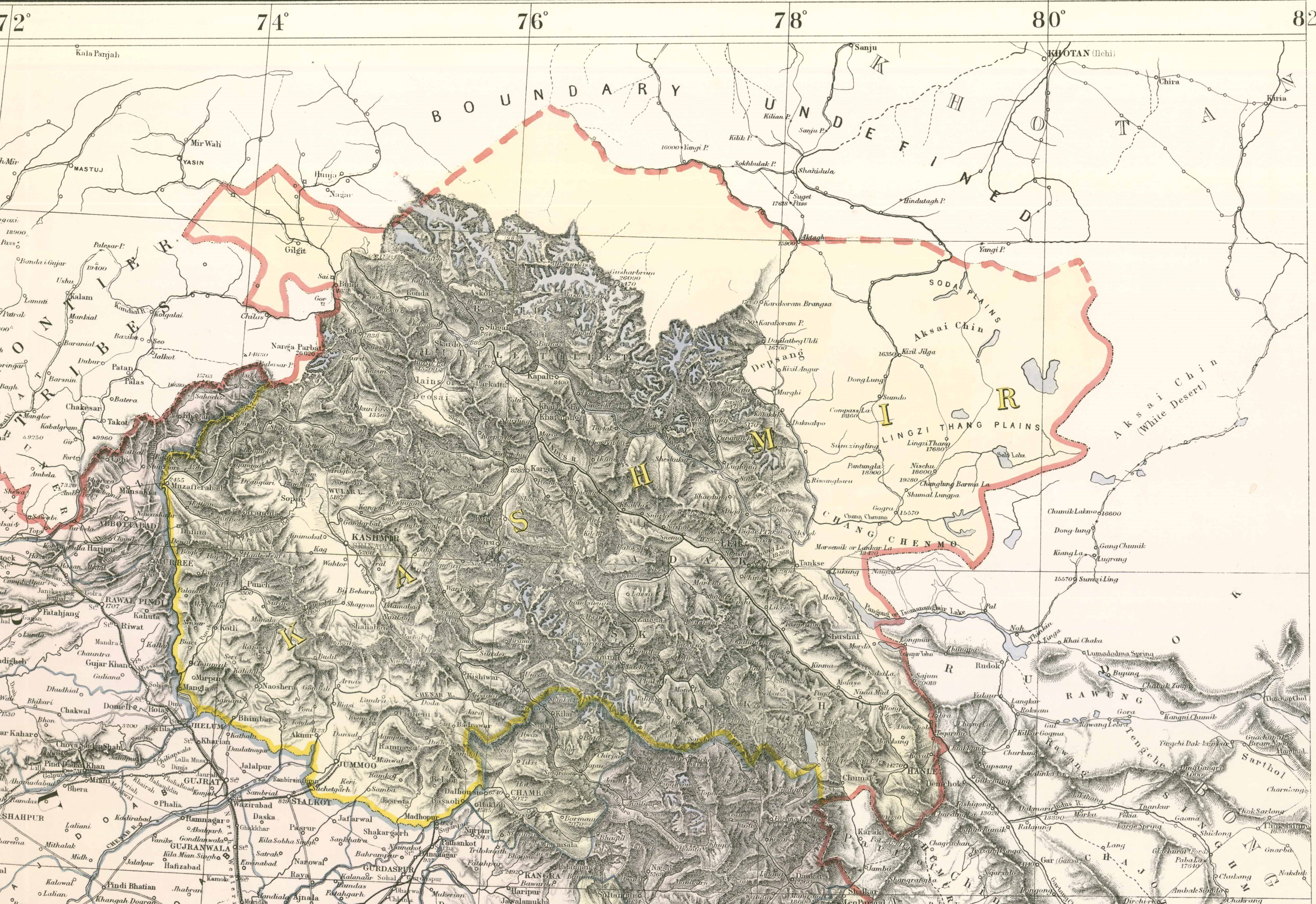
Map 4: Jammu and Kashmir section of the 1888 Survey of India map of India; the northern border passes through Aktagh instead of the Johnson's line along the Kilian and Sanju passes. The undefined boundary shown in dash line from Malubiting, Raskam, Aktagh to a peak on Kunlun mountains 35.2831°N 80.2619°E

In the nineteenth century, Shahidulla became the centre of a multi-pronged game between Kashmir, the British Indian Empire, China, Kashgaria and the Russian Empire.

About 120 Kirghiz nomad families lived in Shahidulla in forty tents. Their head-man was called Turdi Kul. The British regarded the Kirghiz as Chinese subjects and believed that they "always" paid taxes to Yarkand. Yet there is evidence that this may not have occurred till 1881, and the Chinese considered them to be living beyond their boundaries. The Kirghiz faced periodic raids from the Kanjutis of Hunza, who controlled the Yarkand River valley (called "Raskam") and had protection from China. The Kanjutis also carried off people and sold them into slavery.

The Dogra ruler of Jammu, Raja Gulab Singh, then a vassal of the Sikh Empire, conquered Ladakh in 1834. According to Francis Younghusband, all the area up to Shahidulla was immediately taken under control by the Dogras. (Note: There are also records indicating that Gulab Singh's general Zorawar Singh threatened to invade Chinese Turkestan itself, but he was restrained by the British Raj.) This was apparently of no consequence to the Chinese in Turkestan (present day Xinjiang) as they viewed the northern Kunlun range as their border. In 1846, Gulab Singh came under the suzerainty of the British, who established him as the Maharaja of Jammu and Kashmir. The British were inclined to view the Karakoram range as the natural boundary of the Indian subcontinent and they viewed the Maharaja's claim to Shahidulla with trepidation.

This left the tract between the Karakoram and Kunlun ranges as a no-man's land. Since regular trade caravans passed through the area, which were open to robber raids, securing it became important to the Dogra regime in Jammu and Kashmir. A fort at Shahidulla was apparently constructed by the Dogras at an uncertain date. (Note: Ney Elias, a British officer placed in Ladakh, reported (possibly representing Dogra claims) that the fort had been occupied by the Dogras for 20 years and that it was abandoned about 1865.) George Hayward later described it as 'a stone fort and several ruined huts'. Around 1864, when the Chinese authority in Turkestan was overthrown by the Kokand chieftain Yakub Beg, the Dogra governor of Ladakh stationed a garrison of troops at the fort. Described as a chauki (police post), it had a contingent of 25 men including customs officials. The post was abandoned in 1866, apparently due to the difficulty of maintaining it at a great distance. (Note: Other reports indicate that the post was meant to guard against the raids of the Kanjutis (the people of Hunza, a vassal state of Kashmir) on the trade caravans, in an apparent effort to ward off Yakub Beg's own initiative to address the problem.)

In 1865, the British surveyor W. H. Johnson, tasked with surveying all the Ladakhi territory "up to Chinese frontiers", received an invitation for a visit from the then chief of Khotan named Haji Habibullah. Johnson spent a few weeks in Khotan and returned via Sanju Pass and Shahidulla. The border of Ladakh he drew was along the northern Kunlun range (on which the Kilian and Sanju passes lay). It included the Karakash valley along with Shahidullah in Ladakh.

Soon afterwards, Habibullah of Khotan was deposed by Yakub Beg, who took control of the entire Yarkand region (Kashgaria). He is also said to have stationed Kokandi troops at the fort in Shahidullah. (Note: Robert Barkley Shaw, a British merchant in Kangra, India, visited Shahidulla in 1868 on his trip to Yarkand, via the Karakoram Pass. He was held in detention for a time at the fort, which was under the control of the Governor of Yarkand on behalf of Yakub Beg. Shaw writes: "it is merely a camping-ground on the regular old route between Ladâk and Yârkand, and the first place where I should strike that route. Four years ago [i.e. in 1864], while the troubles were still going on in Toorkistân, the Maharaja of Cashmeer sent a few soldiers and workmen across the Karakoram ranges (his real boundary), and built a small fort at Shahidoolla. This fort his troops occupied during two summers; but last year, when matters became settled; and the whole country united under the King of Yarkand, these troops were withdrawn.") In 1873, Douglas Forsyth was dispatched by the British on a diplomatic mission to Yakub Beg. The Forsyth Mission recognised Shahidullah as part of the "Khan's [Yakub Beg's] dominion", and placed the boundary of the British Empire at Ak-tagh, south of the Suget Pass. (See Map 1) From this time onwards, the British officials began to reject Dogra claims to Shahidulla.

In 1877, Yakub Beg died and the Chinese reasserted their authority in Turkestan (renaming it as Xinjiang—"new dominion"). They however stuck to their original posts (karawals) on the north side of the Kilian and Sanju passes, and showed no interest in occupying Shahidulla. As late as 1889, the Turdi Kol reported that Chinese officials told him that Shahidulla was "British territory".

In 1889, Francis Younghusband, who was tasked with finding measures to counteract a potential Russian advance in the area, proposed that the Chinese be encouraged to occupy all the no man's land between the British and Russian territories and serve as a buffer zone. This was agreed by the British administration, and the British envoy in Peking was instructed to discuss the matter with the Chinese government. Simultaneously, Younghusband was sent on a second mission to Yarkand to "induce" the Chinese officials to expand and fill out the no man's land. The means which he used to induce them are not precisely known, but by the end of his mission, the Chinese officials showed a firm commitment to occupy Shahidulla, and even all the area up to the Karakoram Pass. (Note: Indications are that Younghusband "provoked" the Chinese by telling them that the British would occupy the Karakash valley if they did not do so.) It appears that they stationed troops at the Shahidulla fort during the summer months of 1890, but the troops viewed this fort with distaste. In 1892, the Chinese knocked down the Shahidulla fort and built a new fort at Suget Karaul (36.3467°N 78.02564°E), about 10 km. southeast of Shahidulla closer to Suget Pass. Younghusband reported that the Chinese were asserting authority all the way to the Karakoram range, and described the site of the new fort as the closest place to the Karakoram range with the availability of grass and fuel.

=== 20th and 21st centuries ===
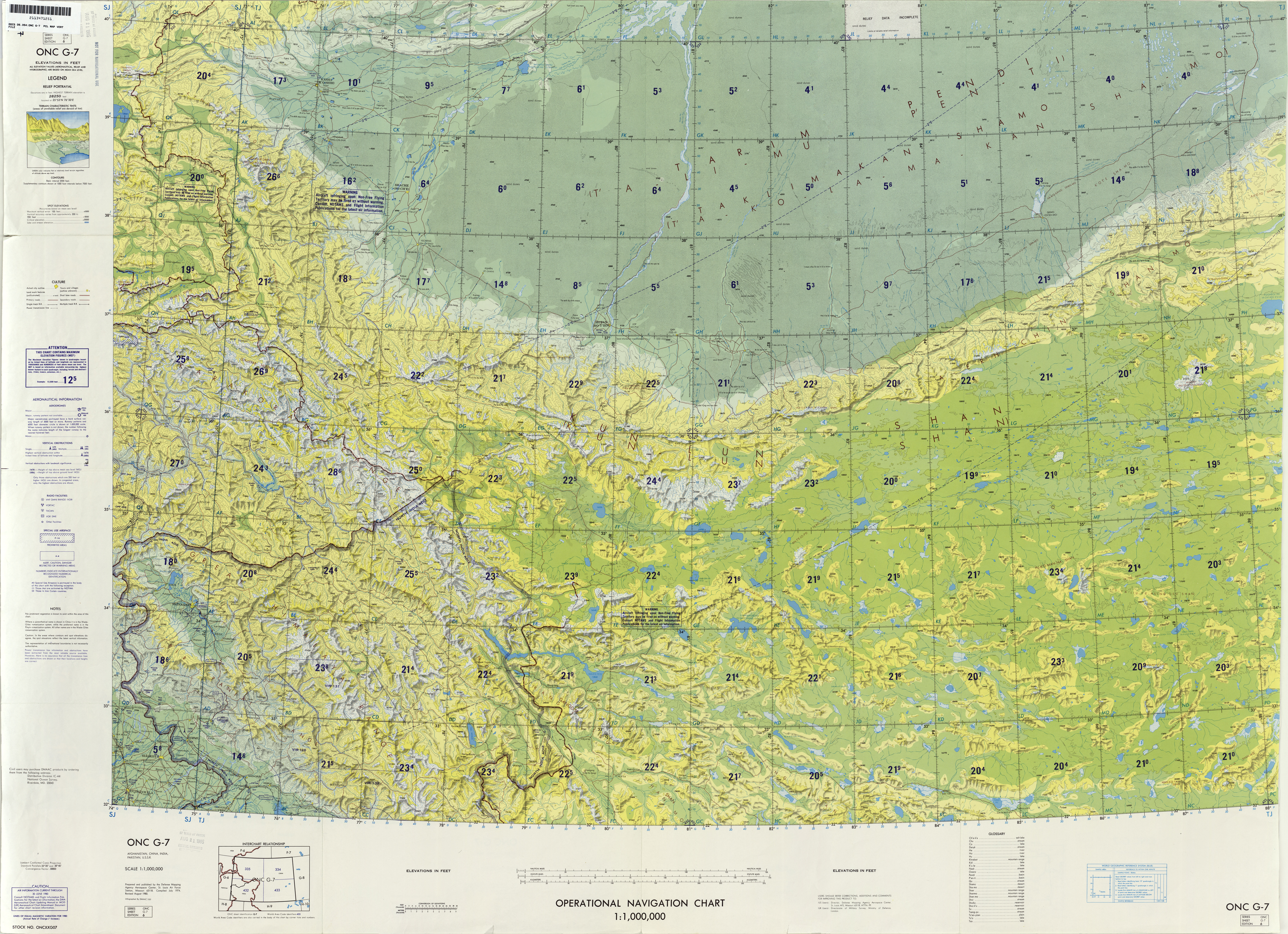
Map including Xaidulla (labelled as Xaidulla (Sai-t’u-la)) (DMA, 1980)

By the early 20th century, the Shahidullah region was under Chinese control and considered part of Xinjiang Province, and has remained so ever since. Xaidulla is well to the north of any territories claimed by either India or Pakistan, while the Sanju and Kilian passes are further to the north of Xaidulla. A Sinkiang–Tibet road (or "Aksai Chin road", now part of G219) was laid by China in the 1950s, which runs from Yecheng in the Tarim Basin, south through Xaidulla, and across the Aksai Chin region, controlled by China but claimed by India, into northwestern Tibet.

== Current status ==
Sometime after the construction of the road, Chinese administration built a village at Suget Karaul and named it "Saitula". The nomad population of the former Shahidula apparently took up residence in the new village. In May 2010, Saitula was made a township.

The township includes one village, which was formerly part of Kangir Kirghiz Township:

- Sarikia (Chinese: 色日克克尔村; pinyin: Sè rì kè kè ěr cūn), also called Ilinagar. 36.5691°N 78.2208°E. It is in the Karakash River valley to the north of Shahidulla at the base of the route to the Sanju Pass. A hamlet called Ali Nazar is also in its vicinity, where Yakub Beg is said to have a built a fort.

== Transportation ==
China National Highway 219 passes through the town of Saitula as well as the historical Shahidullah site. A mountain road runs from the historical site to the town of Sanju in the Tarim basin via the Sanju Pass.

== See also ==
- List of township-level divisions of Xinjiang

== Bibliography ==
- Fisher, Margaret W.; Rose, Leo E.; Huttenback, Robert A. (1963), Himalayan Battleground: Sino-Indian Rivalry in Ladakh, Praeger – via archive.org
- Hill, John E. (2015), Through the Jade Gate - China to Rome: A Study of the Silk Routes 1st to 2nd Centuries CE Volumes I and II., Charleston, SC.: CreateSpace, ISBN 978-1500696702, and. For a downloadable early draft of this book see the Silk Road Seattle website hosted by the University of Washington at: https://depts.washington.edu/silkroad/texts/texts.html
- Hulsewé, A.F.P.; Loewe, M. A. N. (1979), China in Central Asia: The Early Stage: 125 B.C.-A.D. 23, Leiden: E.J. Brill, ISBN 90-04-05884-2
- Kaul, Hriday Nath (2003). India China Boundary in Kashmir. Gyan Publishing House. ISBN 978-81-212-0826-0.
- Mehra, Parshotam (1992), An "agreed" frontier: Ladakh and India's northernmost borders, 1846-1947, Oxford University Press, ISBN 9780195627589
- Noorani, A.G. (2010), India–China Boundary Problem 1846–1947: History and Diplomacy, Oxford University Press India, doi:10.1093/acprof:oso/9780198070689.001.0001, ISBN 978-0-19-908839-3
- Phanjoubam, Pradip (2015), The Northeast Question: Conflicts and frontiers, Routledge, ISBN 978-1-317-34003-4
- Rizvi, Janet (2016). "The trans-Karakoram trade in the nineteenth and twentieth centuries". The Indian Economic & Social History Review. 31 (1): 27–64. doi:10.1177/001946469403100102. ISSN 0019-4646. S2CID 143136590.
- Shaw, Robert (1871), Visits to High Tartary, Yarkand and Kashgar, London: John Murray – via archive.org
- Stanton, Edward (1908), Atlas of the Chinese Empire. (Prepared for the China Inland Mission), London: Morgan & Scott Ltd.
- Stein, M. Aurel (1921), Serindia: Detailed report of explorations in Central Asia and westernmost China, 5 vols., London, Oxford, Clarendon Press. Reprint, Motilal Banarsidass, 1980. London; Delhi. File downloadable from:
- Van Eekelen, Willem Frederik (1967), Indian Foreign Policy and the Border Dispute with China, Springer, ISBN 978-94-017-6555-8
- Warikoo, K. (1996), "Trade relations between Central Asia and Kashmir Himalayas during the Dogra period (1846-1947)", Cahiers d'Asia Centrale (1/2): 113–124
- Younghusband, Francis (1977), Wonders of the Himalayas, Chandigarh: Abhishek Publications – via archive.org
- Younghusband, Francis (1896), The Heart of a Continent, London: John Murray – via archive.org
