= Zihe =

Zihe (Chinese: 子合; Wade–Giles: Tzu-ho) is the name of a polity mentioned in ancient Chinese texts. Its exact location is a matter of debate, although it is usually assumed to be in modern south-west Xinjiang.

During the Former Han period (late 1st millennium BCE), Zihe was referred to as controlling the southern Silk Road town of Xiye (Chinese: 西夜; Wade–Giles: Hsi-yeh, later known as Karghilik). Xiye was also mentioned in the Book of the Later Han (1st and 2nd Centuries CE) as being distinct from Zihe.

Most modern scholars believe that Zihe and Xiye were one and the same. The reasons for this include the phonological similarities between the names Xiye and Zihe.

Other sources state that Zihe may be synonymous with Shahidulla (Xaidulla), more than 200 km (120 mi.) south-south-east of Karghilik. However, this identification is controversial.
