= Hunza (princely state) =

Former state in South Asia

Coordinates: 36.333°N 74.666°E

- c. 1200–1974
- Flag Coat of arms
- Capital: Baltit (Karimabad)
- Official languages: Persian (until 1947); Urdu (after 1947)
- Religion: Islam
- Demonym: Hunzakut
- Government: Principality
- Mir
  - 1680–1697: Salim Khan II (first known)
  - 1945–1974: Mohammad Jamal Khan (last)
- History
  - Established: c. 1200
  - Hunza–Nagar Campaign: 1891
  - Accession to Pakistan: 1947
  - Disestablished: 24 September 1974

Area
  - Total: 3,900 sq mi (10,000 km^{2})

Population
  - 1941 census: 15,341
- Website http://hunzastate.org
- Today part of: Pakistan

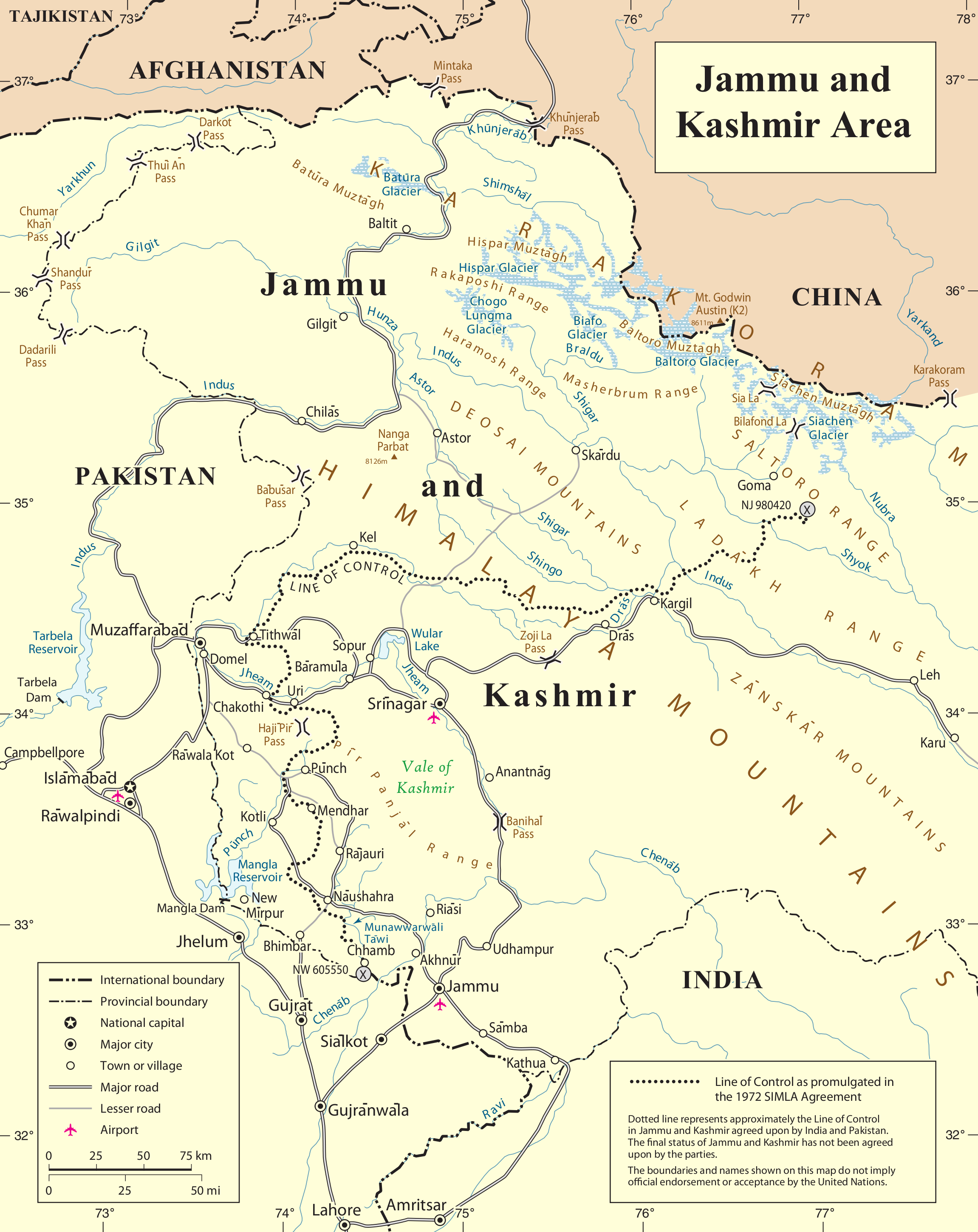
UN map (1972) of Jammu and Kashmir showing the Karakoram Highway up to the Khunjerab Pass. Baltit (Karimabad) was the capital of Hunza.

Hunza (Persian: هنزه, Urdu: ہنزہ), also known as Kanjut (Persian: کانجوت; Burushaski: کنجوت), was a Burusho kingdom in the present-day Gilgit-Baltistan region of Pakistan. Initially an independent monarchy for centuries, it became a princely state under subsidiary alliance with the British India in 1891 after the Anglo-Burusho War. Although Hunza also accepted the suzerainty of the maharaja of Jammu and Kashmir, it was not a part of Kashmir and had status of a separate state. Until the early 20th century, Hunza paid tribute to Qing China as well. For a brief period of three months after the partition of British India it remained unaligned, and then acceded to Pakistan in November 1947. It was the last princely state of Pakistan to be abolished in 1974.

In the early 20th century, Hunza bordered the Ishkoman illaqa of Gilgit Agency to the west, the princely state of Nagar to the south, the Ladakh Wazarat of Jammu and Kashmir to the east, Xinjiang region of China to the northeast and Afghanistan to the northwest. It covered an area of 3,900 sq mi (10,000 km^{2}) and had a population of 15,341 people at the time of the 1941 Census. The state capital was Baltit. It is now part of the Hunza District in Gilgit-Baltistan.

== History ==
Hunza was an independent principality, established in around 1200. The rulers of Hunza claimed a lineage from Alexander the Great. They were initially known as Thum, later taking the title of Mir of Hunza. The people of Hunza were known as Kanjutis.

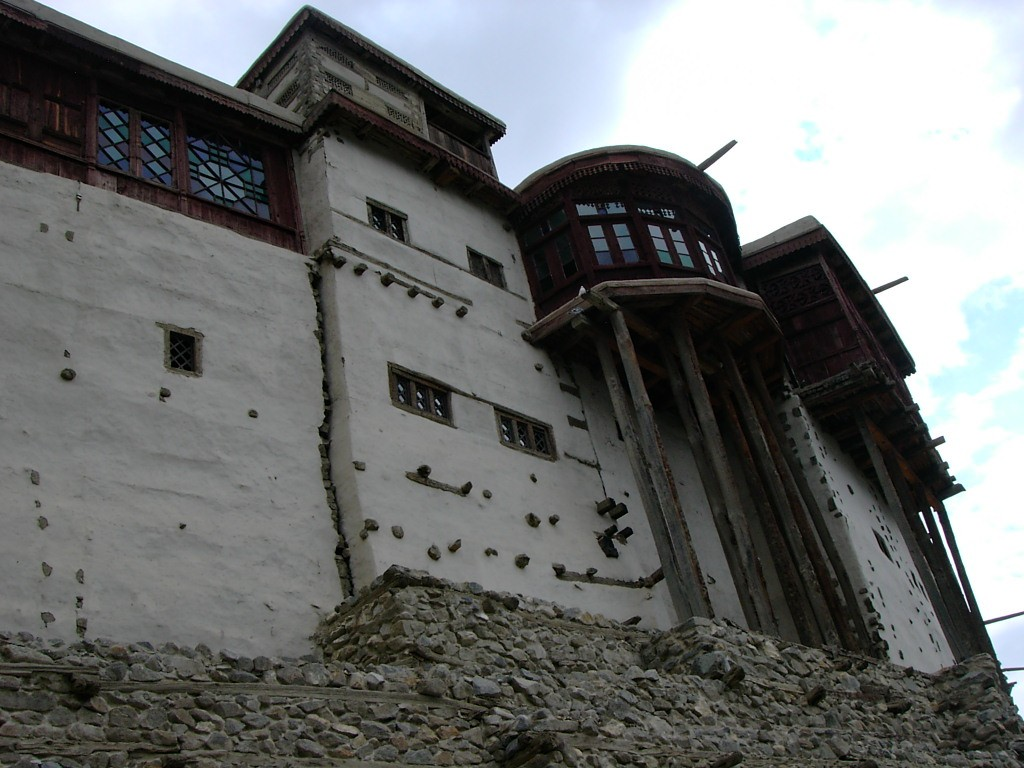
Baltit Fort, the former residence of the Mirs of Hunza

=== Relationship with China ===
The Kanjuti people maintained their relationship with China, recognizing Qing Qianlong Emperor as their suzerain from around 1760 or 1761. Hunza paid an annual tribute of sixteen tola of gold-dust and received various subsidiaries from China in return including silk clothes, black tea, and porcelain ware. In their view, both they and the Emperor of China held the most pivotal leadership roles in the world. Historically, there were instances when the Kanjutis conducted raids on mountainous regions within the Karakoram and Kunlun Mountains, including areas like Xaidulla, where certain nomadic Kirghiz groups resided. These raids sometimes resulted in the Kirghiz being taken as slaves and subsequently sold to the Chinese authorities.

From 1847, the Mir of Hunza gave nominal allegiance to China. Mir Ghazanfur Khan helped China in the war against the Uyghur separatist Afaqi Khoja revolts in Yarkand, after which China granted Mir a jagir (land grant) in Yarkand and paid him a subsidy. In 1860, the Mir paid tribute to the Dogras after their conquest of Gilgit, and Hunza became a tributary to both Jammu Kashmir and China. The last fully independent ruler, Mir Safdar Khan, who ruled from 1886, escaped to China after an invasion by the British.

In the late 19th century Hunza became embroiled in the Great Game, the rivalry between Britain and Russia for control of the northern approaches to India. The British suspected Russian involvement "with the Rulers of the petty States on the northern boundary of Kashmir"; In 1888, the Russian explorer Bronislav Grombchevsky reached Hunza, and the following year the British captain Francis Younghusband visited Hunza to express British displeasure at Kanjuti raids in the Raskam. Younghusband formed a low opinion of the ruler, Safdar Ali, describing him as "a cur at heart and unworthy of ruling so fine a race as the people of Hunza". In 1891, the British mounted the Hunza-Nagar Campaign and gained control of Hunza and the neighbouring valley of Nagar. The Mir, Safdar Khan, fled to China with his two brothers, Prince Muhammad Nafis Khan and Prince Muhammad Nazim Khan.

Prince Muhammad Nafis Khan was the primary claimant of the Mir-ship of Hunza as the eldest son of Mir Ghazan Khan I. However, the British installed his younger brother Muhammad Nazim Khan as Mir in September 1892. Hunza became a princely state in a subsidiary alliance with British India, a status it retained until 1947. The Kuomintang Republic of China government engaged in secret negotiations with the Mir of Hunza over restoring the state's previous relationship with China, amidst the partitioning of British India, with the Hunza state independent from India and Pakistan. The Kuomintang also plotted to expand its influence into Kashmir, taking advantage of the weakness of the newly independent India. However, due to the war of 1947 in Kashmir, the Mir of Hunza changed his mind and acceded to Pakistan, after a coup against maharaja in Gilgit.

=== Territorial claims ===
Historically the Kanjutis cultivated and grazed areas to the north and the Mir claimed those areas as part of Hunza's territories. Those areas included the Taghdumbash Pamir and the Raskam Valley.

According to Kanjuti traditions, as related by McMahon, the Mir's eighth ancestor, Shah Salim Khan, pursued nomadic Kirghiz thieves to Tashkurghan and defeated them. "To celebrate this victory, Shah Salim Khan erected a stone cairn at Dafdar and sent a trophy of a Kirghiz head to the Chinese with a message that Hunza territory extended as far as Dafdar". The Kanjutis were already in effective possession of the Raskam and no question had been raised about it. The Mir's claims went a good deal beyond a mere right of cultivation. He "asserts that forts were built by the Kanjutis without any objection or interference from the Chinese at Dafdar, Qurghan, Ujadhbhai, Azar on the Yarkand River and at three or four other places in Raskam."

McMahon was able roughly to define the territorial limits of Kanjut. "The boundaries of Taghdumbash, Khunjerab, and Raskam, as claimed by the Kanjutis, are the following: the northern watershed of the Taghdumbash Pamir from the Wakhjir Pass through the Baiyik peak to Dafdar, thence across the river to the Zankan nullah; thence through Mazar and over the range to Urok, a point on the Yarkand river between Sibjaida and Itakturuk. Thence it runs along the northern watershed of the Raskam valley to the junction of the Bazar Dara River and the Yarkand River. From thence southwards over the mountains to the Mustagh River leaving the Aghil Dewan or Aghil Pass within Hunza limits."

In 1898 Captain H. Н. P. Deasy substantially corroborated McMahon's information. Deasy resigned his commission to devote himself to trans-Himalayan exploration. An item of special interest was Deasy's description of the limits of Raskam. Starting from Aghil Dewan or pass, in the Karakoram range, the dividing line ran north-east to Bazar Dara, where it met the Yarkand River. He found an outpost built of earth at Bazar Dara, surmounted by a Chinese flag (by 1898 the Chinese had intruded to the area south of the Kun Lun Mountains with a few unarmed Kirghiz in occupation. This marked the boundary claimed by China). From there the line ran "along the northern watershed of the Raskam valley to Dafdar in the Taghdumbash Pamir, to the north of the mills at that place, and thence to the Baiyik peak. Deasy also came upon clear evidence of what could only have been Kanjuti occupation. South of Azgar "many ruins of houses, old irrigation channels and fields now no longer tilled, testify to Raskam having formerly been inhabited and cultivated". Anyone familiar with the care with which the Kanjutis cultivate every available strip of land in Hunza would have no hesitation in regarding this as proof of long standing Kanjuti occupation. The remains could not have been attributed to the Kirghiz; they were unfamiliar with the state of art. "Seven locations in the Raskam were involved. Azgar and Ursur on the right bank, and five others on the left, that is on the Mustagh-Karakoram side-Kukbash, Kirajilga, Ophrang, Uroklok, and Oitughrak, extending from Sarakamish, north of Kunjerab pass to Bazar Dara, north of the Arghil pass". He said it was an area of about 3,000 acres (12 km^{2}).

The Chinese completed the reconquest of Xinjiang in 1878. Before they lost southern parts of the province to Yakub Beg in 1863, their practical authority, as Ney Elias and Younghusband consistently maintained, had never extended south of their outposts at Sanju and Kilian along the northern foothills of the Kun Lun range. Nor did they establish a known presence to the south of the line of outposts in the twelve years immediately following their return. Ney Elias, who had been Joint Commissioner in Ladakh for several years, noted on 21 September 1889 that he had met the Chinese in 1879 and 1880 when he visited Kashgar. "They told me that they considered their line of 'chatze', or posts, as their frontier – viz., Kugiar, Kilian, Sanju, Kiria, etc.- and that they had no concern with what lay beyond the mountains" i.e. the Kun Lun range in northern Kashmir.

In March 1899 the British proposed, in a Note from Sir Claude MacDonald to China, a new boundary between China and British India. The Note proposed that China should relinquish its claims to suzerainty over Hunza, and in return Hunza should relinquish its claims to most of the Taghdumbash and Raskam districts. The Chinese did not respond to the note.

Until 1937 the inhabitants of the Taghdumbash Pamir paid tribute to the Mir of Hunza, who exercised control over the pastures.

=== Relationship with Jammu and Kashmir ===
In the times of Maharaja Ranbir Singh of Jammu and Kashmir, the British mediated a tributary relation between Kashmir and the Mir of Hunza in 1869. Hence Hunza gained a unique tributary association with the three powers, China, British India and Kashmir, simultaneously. The Mirs continued to send tributes to China and Kashmir and received subsidiaries in return. They also received subsidiaries from the British colonial government, a position further complicated by the establishment of Gilgit Agency in 1889 when British Raj took the direct responsibility of supervising the petty states along the Russian border. In 1935 British formerly leased the part of Gilgit Wazarat, putting an end to system of dual governance.

The ambiguous status of Hunza vis-à-vis China, the Kashmir princely state and the British India continued to be a source of friction among the three powers during the first half of 20th century. In 1936, the British tried to prevent Mir of Hunza from paying tribute to China and cultivating lands beyond the northern watersheds of Karakoram. In return, the Mir was proposed to be granted jagir in the Gilgit Wazarat of Jammu and Kashmir. Hunza sent tribute to China for the last time in 1938. After the passage of Government of India Act 1935, the Maharaja of Kashmir decided to join the federation. He was of point of view that as a part of Kashmir, the states of Hunza and Nagar would automatically join it. The British Indian government strictly contradicted this point of view, maintaining that these territories, “[…] though under Kashmir’s suzerainty, were never recognized as a part of Kashmir.” In 1939, the Kashmir state government issued a lengthy memorandum written by the Prime Minister Ram Chandra Kak, which claimed that the areas under dispute “have been an integral part of the territories of Jammu and Kashmir State […].” Finally, in a 1941 decision the British Indian government settled that, “Hunza and Nager were not part of J&K State but separate states and that the other areas in question were not parts of J&K but were in fact tribal areas.” Following this decision, the British government took measures to separate the administration of Gilgit Agency from Kashmir. For example, the population of Hunza was not included in the sum total of Jammu and Kashmir in the 1941 Census, and the people of Hunza were no longer considered state subjects, but crown subjects.

Regardless, the Maharaja of Kashmir maintained his claims over Hunza and other territories. After the untimely termination of lease agreement of 1935, the British handed over the administration of not only the Gilgit Wazarat but the whole agency in 1947 to Maharaja. In the words of historian Chad Haines, "Those regions so unequivocally stated as not being "part of Kashmir" in 1935 were given to the State of Jammu and Kashmir without any question or debate by the British." In the correspondence of the Maharaja of Jammu and Kashmir dated 26 October 1947 with Lord Mountbatten, Governor General of India Maharaja claimed that the state of Jammu and Kashmir has a common boundary with the "Soviet Republic", while the Indian Prime Minister Pandit Jawaharlal Nehru had also made a similar claim that "Jammu and Kashmir's Northern frontiers, as you are aware, run in common with those of three countries, Afghanistan, the Union of Soviet Socialist Republics and China".

The Chinese, on their part, never accepted Hunza as British or Kashmir territory and continued to claim Hunza until the signing of Sino-Pakistan Border Agreement in 1963.

=== Accession to Pakistan ===
On 3 November, 1947, the ruler, Mohammad Jamal Khan sent a telegram to Mohammad Ali Jinnah acceding his state to Pakistan. It stated:

"I declare with pleasure on behalf of myself and my State accession to Pakistan."

== List of rulers ==
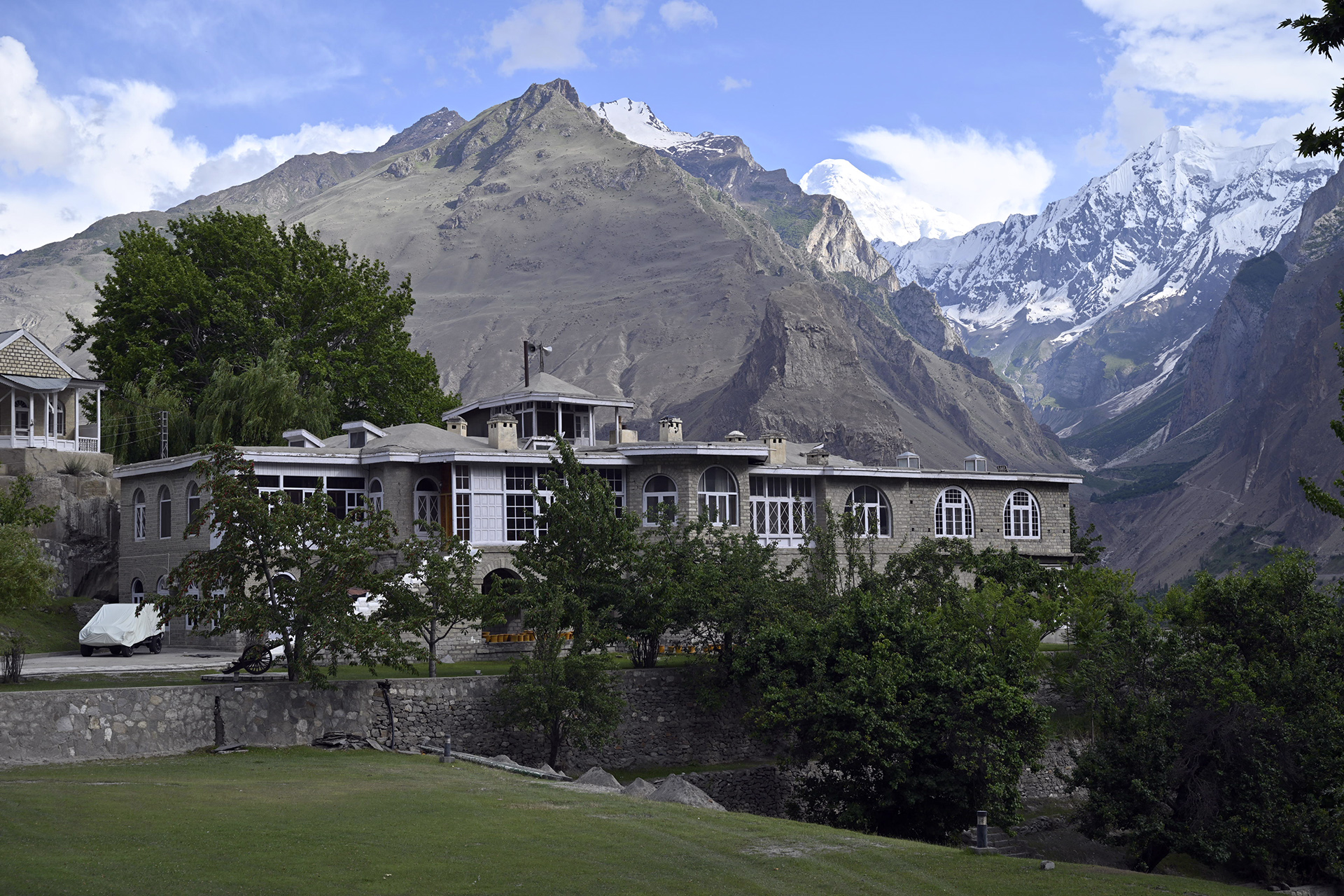
Mir's Palace in Karimabad, Hunza. This historic residence of the Mir of Hunza was used for official functions and winter lodging. It remains a key symbol of the region’s princely past.

The hereditary rulers, the Mirs were assisted by a council of Viziers or ministers. The Mir used to have the Burushaski title of Thum (also Tham or Thom), later changed to Mir, a Persian form of the Arabic title Emir. Details of early rulers are uncertain, with the first definite dates from 1750 onwards.

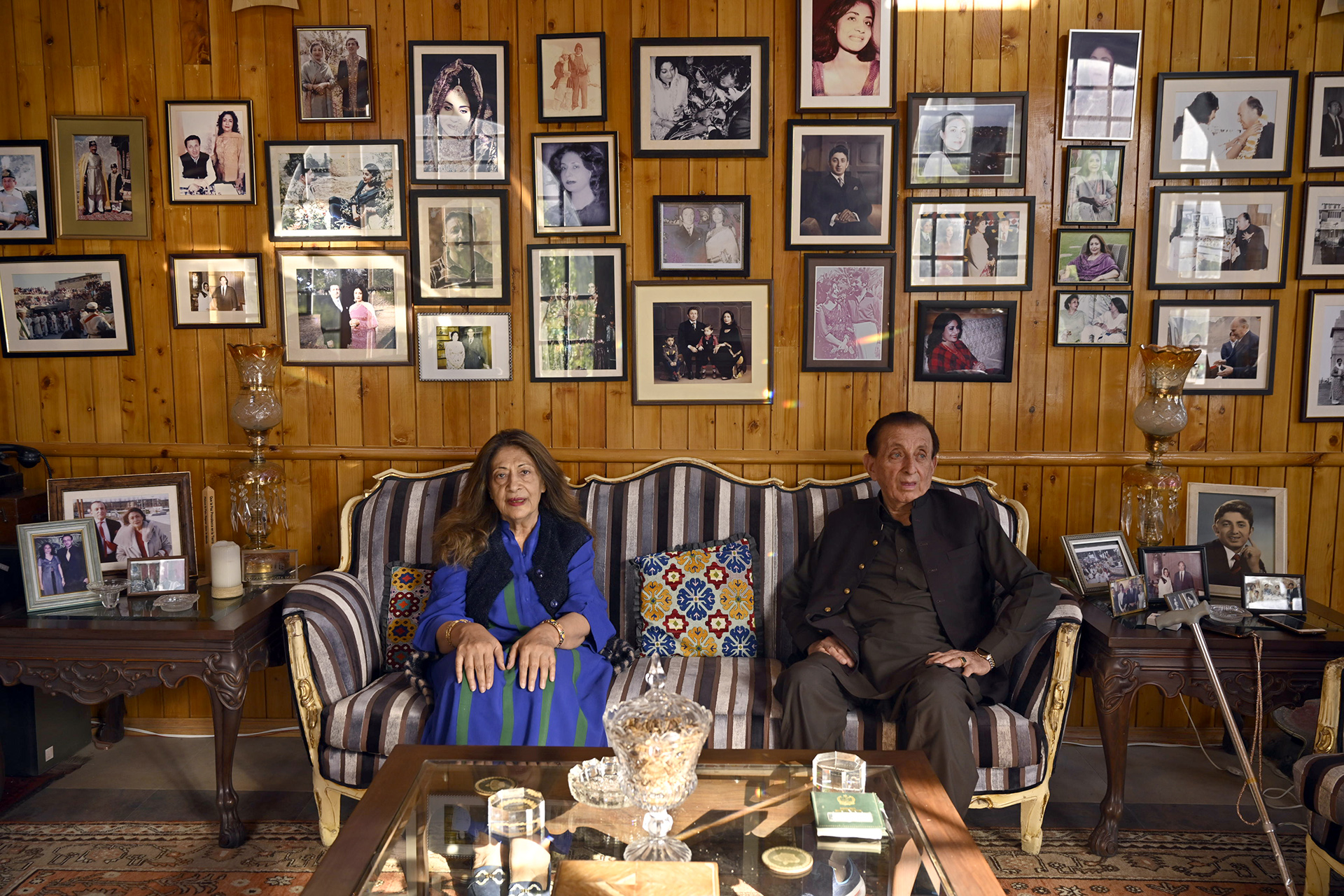
Mir Ghazanfar Ali Khan II and his wife, Rani Atiga, in Mir's residence in Karimabad, Hunza, Pakistan. (2024)

Reign	Mirs of Hunza
1680 – 1697	Salim Khan II
1697 – 1710	Shah Sultan Khan
1710 – 1735	Shahbaz Khan
1735 – 1750	Shahbeg Khan
1750 – 1790	Shah Khusro Khan
1790 – 1804	Mirza Khan
1803 – 1825	Salim Khan III
1825 – 1863	Ghazanfur Khan
1863 – 1886	Mohammad Ghazan Khan I
1886 – 1891	Safdar Ali Khan
1891 – 1938	Mohammad Nazim Khan KCIE
1938 – 1945	Mohammad Ghazan Khan II
1945 – 1974	Mohammad Jamal Khan
1974 – present	Mir Ghazanfar Ali Khan

== Geography ==
The kingdom encompassed the Hunza Valley, situated at an elevation of 2,438 metres (7,999 feet). The former capital Baltit has an elevation of 2477 metres (8129 feet). Both Baltit and an earlier fort, Altit Fort, have been extensively restored and are major tourist attractions in the region.

For many centuries, Hunza has provided the quickest access to Swat and Gandhara for a person travelling on foot. The route was impassable to baggage animals; only human porters could get through, and then only with permission from the locals.

Hunza was easily defended as the paths were often less than half a metre (about 18") wide. The high mountain paths often crossed bare cliff faces on logs wedged into cracks in the cliff, with stones balanced on top. They were also constantly exposed to regular damage from weather and falling rocks. These were the much feared "hanging passageways" of the early Chinese histories that terrified all, including several famous Chinese Buddhist monks.

== Demographics ==
Most of the people of Hunza were Ismaili Muslims. It had a population of 15,431 at the time last colonial census in 1941. The official language of the state was Persian until 1947, when it was replaced by Urdu. The common language of Hunza was Burushaski, while Wakhi and Shina languages were also spoken in Upper and Lower Hunza respectively.

== See also ==
- Karakoram Highway
- Chitral

== Bibliography ==
- Hopkirk, Peter (2006), The Great Game, Hodder & Stoughton, ISBN 978-1-84854-477-2
- Lall, J. S. (1989), Aksaichin and Sino-Indian Conflict, Allied Publishers
- Lin, Hsiao-ting (2010). Modern China's Ethnic Frontiers: A Journey to the West. Taylor & Francis. ISBN 978-0-203-84497-7.
- Mehra, Parshotham (1991), ""John Lall, Aksai Chin and Sino-Indian Conflict" (Book review)", China Report, 27 (2): 147–154, doi:10.1177/000944559102700206, S2CID 153622885
- Haines, Chad (2012). Nation, Territory, and Globalization in Pakistan: Traversing the Margins. Routledge. ISBN 978-1-136-44997-0.
- Sökefeld, Martin (2023). Duschinski, Haley; Bhan, Mona; Robinson, Cabeiri deBergh (eds.). Locating Gilgit-Baltistan. The Palgrave Handbook of New Directions in Kashmir Studies. Cham: Springer International Publishing. pp. 59–76. doi:10.1007/978-3-031-28520-2_4. ISBN 978-3-031-28520-2.
- Noorani, A.G. (2010), India–China Boundary Problem 1846–1947: History and Diplomacy, Oxford University Press India, doi:10.1093/acprof:oso/9780198070689.001.0001, ISBN 978-0-19-908839-3
- Woodman, Dorothy (1970) [first published in 1969 by Barrie & Rockliff, The Cresset Press], Himalayan Frontiers: A Political Review of British, Chinese, Indian, and Russian Rivalries, Praeger
