= Jamal of Hunza =

Last Mir of Hunza from 1945 to 1974

Jamal Khan I
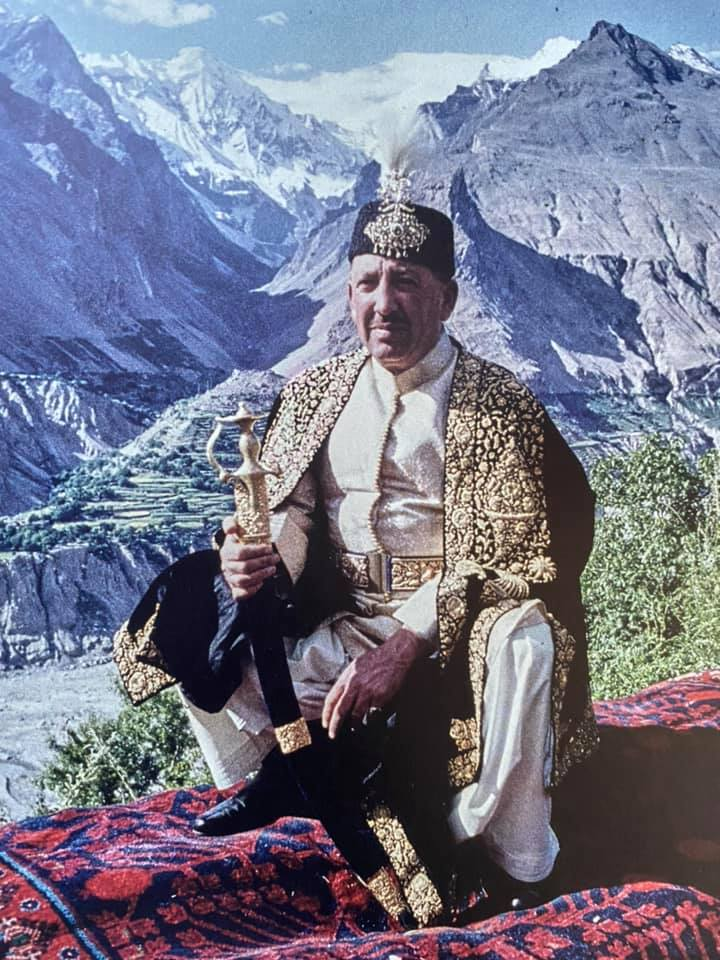

King of Hunza
- Reign: 1945–1974
- Predecessor: King Ghazan Khan II
- Successor: Monarchy abolished
- Born: Muhammad Jamal Khan; 23 September 1912; State of Hunza
- Died: 18 March 1976; Karimabad, Gilgit-Baltistan (then Northern Areas)
- Spouse: Princess Shams-un-Nehar of Nagar
- Father: King Ghazan Khan II of Hunza
- Religion: Nizari Isma'ilism

Mir Jamal Khan I of Hunza (September 23, 1912 – March 18, 1976) was the last King of the State of the Kingdom of Hunza.

== Early life ==
The son and heir of Mir Ghazan Khan CBE, heir to the throne of Hunza, Muhammad Jamal Khan was born in 1912 and educated in Gilgit, mostly at home. For most of his youth Hunza was ruled by his grandfather, Sir Mir Muhammad Nazim Khan, KCSI KCIE, who ruled the state for 79 years, dying in 1938. His father, Ghazan Khan, succeeded as Mir in 1938, when Jamal became the heir apparent.

== Reign ==
In April, 1945 at the age of 33, Jamal succeeded his father. In August 1947, the British withdrew from the Indian subcontinent, partitioning their possessions between India and Pakistan and leaving the princely states independent. Jamal visited Kashmir in the hope of persuading Hari Singh, the Maharaja of Jammu and Kashmir, to accede his state to the new Dominion of Pakistan. In October 1947, Jamal acceded his own state of Hunza to Pakistan. He joined in the Indo-Pakistani War of 1947–1948 over Jammu and Kashmir and was rewarded with the title of Ghazi-e-Millat.

In 1951, Aga Khan IV formed 64 local councils in the Northern Areas of Pakistan, and appointed Jamal as President of his Supreme Council for Hunza and Chitral and also as his Personal Representative in Central Asia.

In 1962, for his help to the Italian mountaineering expedition to K-2, Italy awarded Jamal its Order of the Grand Officer.

In October 1969, Jamal was invited to Paris to attend the marriage of the Aga Khan with Begum Salimah. After the ceremony, he and his wife showered 49 pearls at their feet as an act of reverence.

The President of Pakistan also gave Jamal the titles of Hilal-e-Pakistan and Hilal-e-Juraet, and in December, 1964, he was promoted to the rank of honorary Major General in the Pakistani Army.

The Mir's rule in Hunza came to an end in 1974 when Zulfikar Ali Bhutto, the Prime Minister of Pakistan, abolished his government and annexed the state to the Northern Areas of Pakistan, under the federal government. Jamal was forced to abdicate, and two years later he died at his residence in Karimabad, the former capital.

== Personal life ==
In 1934 Jamal married Shams-un-Nehar, a princess of the state of Nagar, and they had two sons and three daughters, including Mir Ghazanfar Ali Khan.

== See also ==
- Hunza (princely state)
