= Sanju Pass =

Mountain pass in western China

- Location within Southern Xinjiang
- Elevation: 5,364 metres (17,598 ft)
- Traversed by: Thomas Douglas Forsyth, 1873

Third Approach
- Location: Pishan County, Xinjiang, China
- Range: Kunlun Mountains
- Coordinates: 36.6702°N 78.2456°E

The Sanju, or Sanju-la (Chinese: 桑株古道; Wade–Giles: Sang^{1}-chu^{1} ku^{3}-tao^{4}), with an elevation of 5,364 metres (17,598 ft), is a historical mountain pass in the Kun Lun Mountains in Pishan County, Hotan Prefecture, Xinjiang, China. During ancient times, it was the last on a series of difficult passes on the most common summer caravan route between Ladakh and the Tarim Basin. In recent years, besides being used by the locals, it has also become a trekking route for Chinese trekkers. In early 2020s, a scenic unpaved auto tour route was opened along the trail for road trippers.

== Geography and caravan routes ==
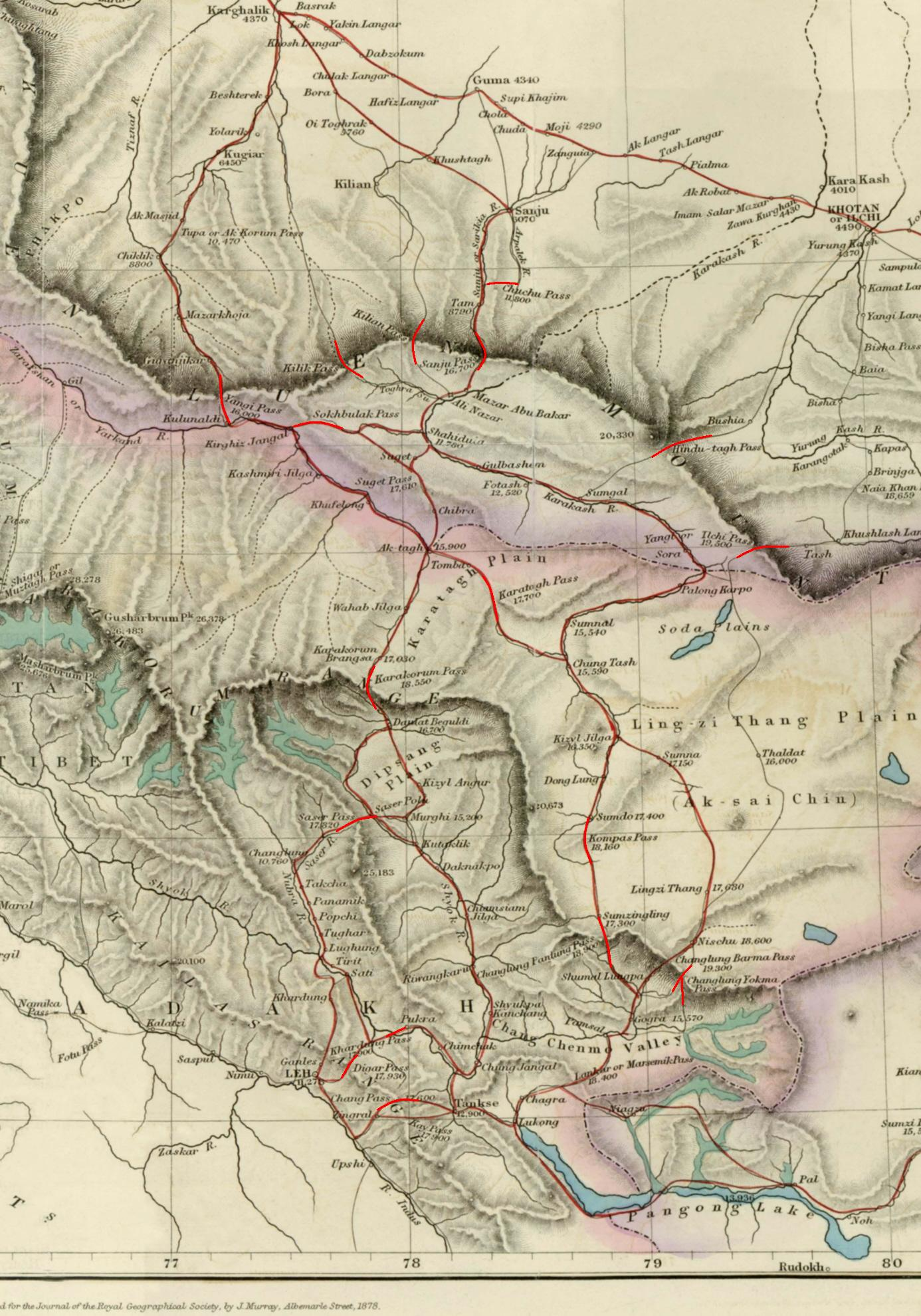
Map 1: 19th century trade routes through Shahidulla (located in the centre of the map, near the western bend of the Karakash River). The bold lines represent the Karakoram range in the south and the "Killian range", the northern branch of the Kunlun Mountains, in the north. The Sanju Pass is on the Killian range at the centre. (Map not drawn to scale)

Sanju Pass
- Traditional Chinese: 桑株古道
- Simplified Chinese: 桑株古道
Transcriptions
Standard Mandarin
- Hanyu Pinyin: sāngzhū gǔdào

Alternative Chinese name
- Traditional Chinese: 桑株達坂
- Simplified Chinese: 桑株达坂
Transcriptions
Standard Mandarin
- Hanyu Pinyin: sāngzhū dábǎn

Historically, the main route from Northern India to the Tarim Basin led through the Nubra Valley in Ladakh across the ice-covered Sasser Pass (5,411 metres or 17,753 feet) and the even higher Karakoram Pass (5,575 metres or 18,291 feet) and the relatively easy Suget Pass to the staging post at Shahidulla. From there in summer the caravans normally headed north across the Sanju Pass to modern Guma (Pishan) in the Tarim Basin and then either northwest to Karghalik and Yarkand or northeast to Khotan.

After traversing the Sanju Pass, the caravans descended to the village of Sanju from where a good road led 122 miles (196 km) to Yarkand, meeting up with the Kilian route at Bora and the Kilik and Kugiar routes at Karghalik.

From Shahidula to the Tarim Basin the traveller had a choice of three passes, the Kilik (not to be confused with the Kilik Pass leading from the Hunza Valley to the north), the Kilian Pass and the Sanju; but the usual route for caravans in the 19th century was via the Sanju Pass.

The Kilik Pass was reportedly once frequently used by Balti merchants based in Yarkand and had plenty of fodder and fuel at every stage. It was said to be the easiest and shortest route, but merchants were not allowed to use it for political reasons. Travellers were also often prevented from accessing it for considerable periods during hot weather due to flooding of the Toghra about 9 miles (14 km) below Shahidula. After crossing the pass the route joined the Kugiar route at Beshterek, one day's march south of Karghalik.

Apparently, the Kilian was previously the most frequented pass, though it was little used in the 19th century except sometimes in the summer. It is higher than the Sanju Pass and also impractical for laden horses, but reportedly not so difficult to cross. The road then descends to the village of Kilian and, after two marches one reached Bora on the road between Sanju and Karghalik. The summit of the pass is always covered with ice and snow and is not practicable for laden ponies - yaks have to be used.

== History ==
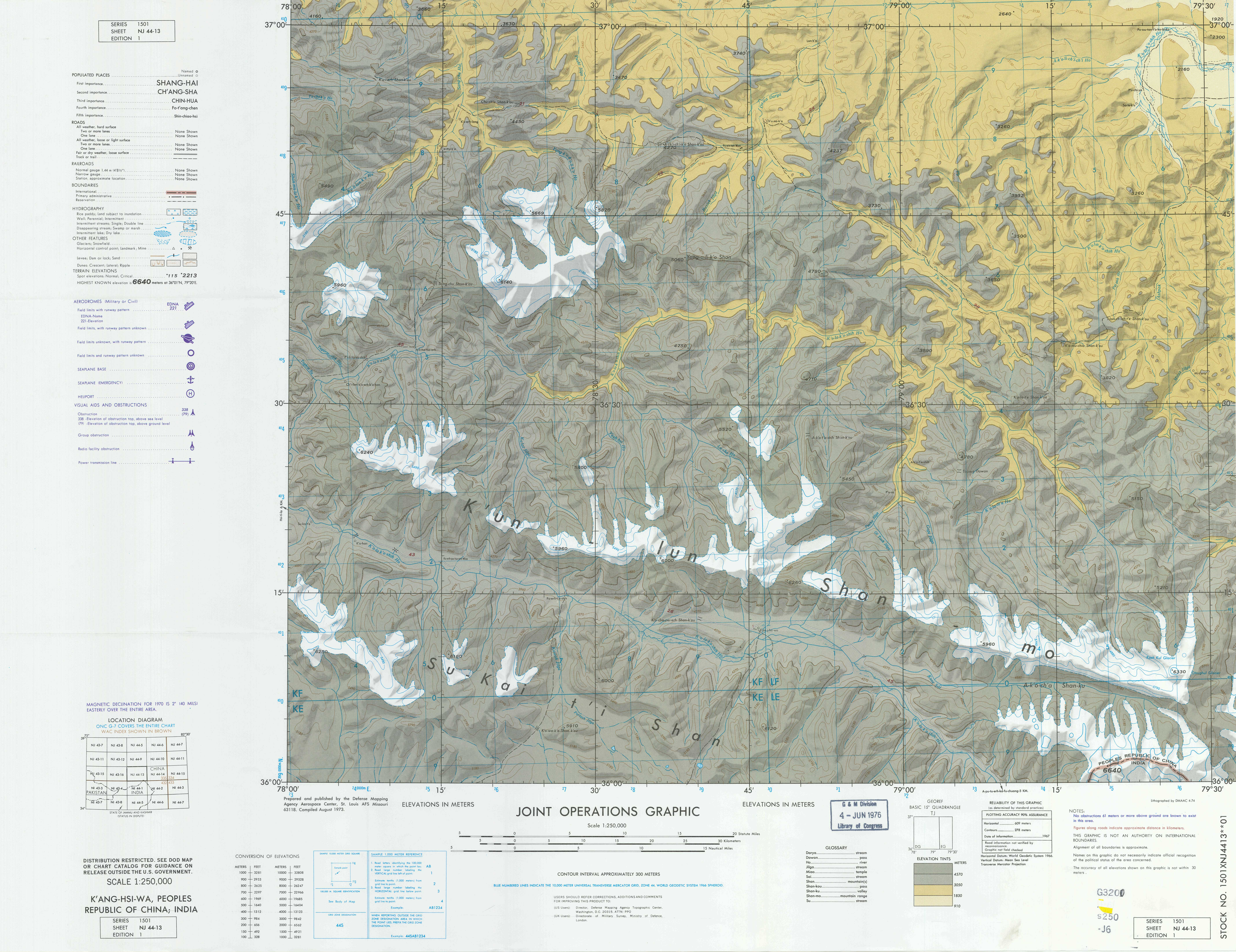
Map including Sanju Pass (labeled as Sang-chu Shan-k'ou) (DMA, 1973)

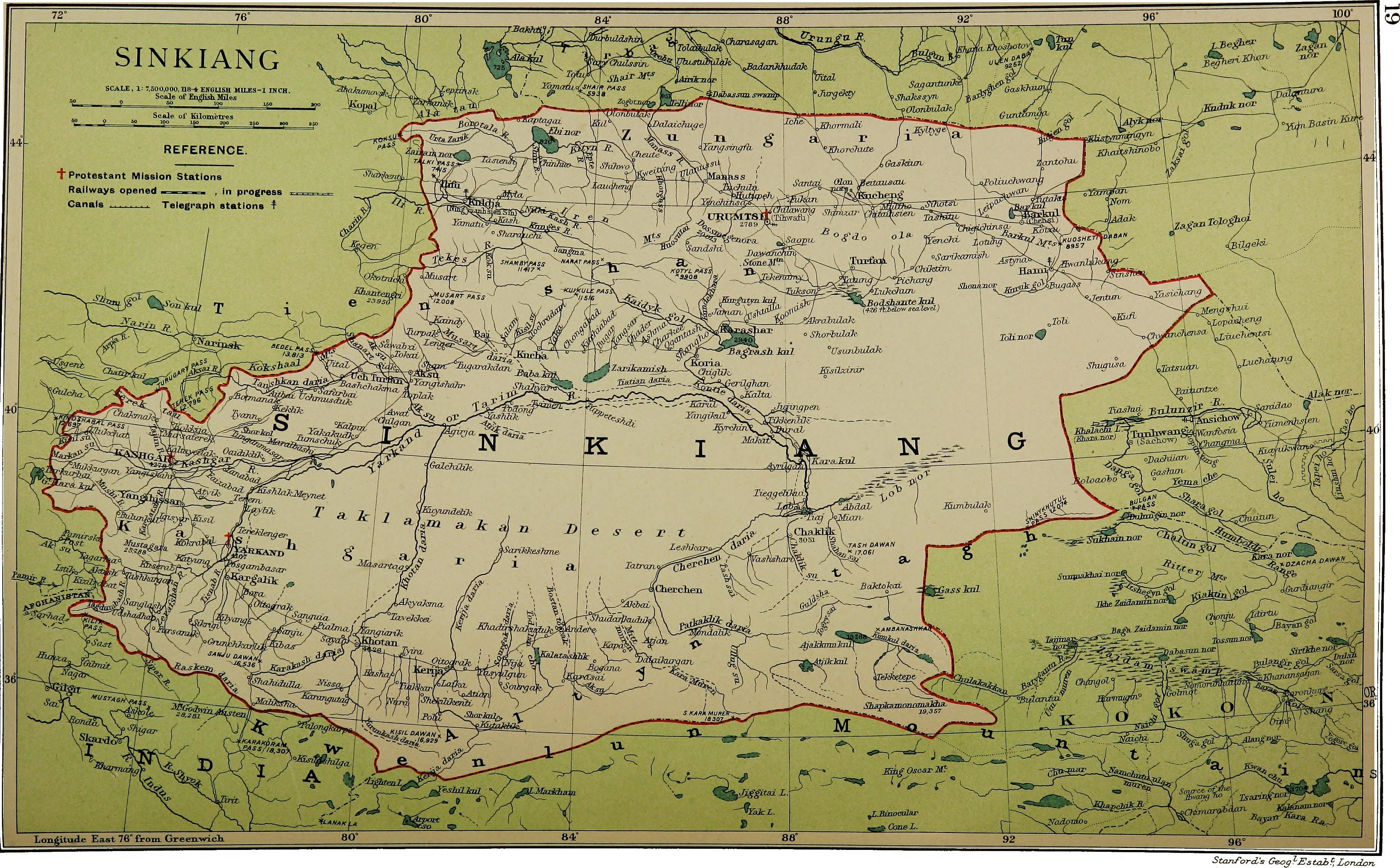
Map including Sanju Pass (labeled as Sanju Dawan) (1917)

=== 19th-century Kashmiri claim ===
During the Dungan revolt in 1862, the political status of Xinjiang as part of the Qing dynasty became uncertain. The border between British India and the semi-independent State of Kashmir with Xinjiang became a matter of some speculation. In attempt to assert control to the Kunlun Mountains, the Maharajah of Kashmir constructed a fort at Shahidulla, and had troops stationed there for some years to protect caravans. Eventually, most sources placed Shahidulla and the upper Karakash River firmly within the territory of Xinjiang. According to Francis Younghusband, who explored the region in the late 1880s, there was only an abandoned fort and not one inhabited house at Shahidulla when he was there - it was just a convenient staging post and a convenient headquarters for the nomadic Kirghiz. The abandoned fort had apparently been built a few years earlier by the Kashmiris. There is evidence that the Chinese had mined jade in the region at least as early as the Later Han Dynasty and up until the quarries were abandoned during the Muslim Rebellion in 1863–4, just prior to Mr. Johnson's trip in 1865.

Thomas Douglas Forsyth who was entrusted with the task of visiting the Court of Atalik Ghazi pursuant to the visit on 28 March 1870 of the envoy of Atalik Ghazi, Mirza Mohammad Shadi, stated that "it would be very unsafe to define the boundary of Kashmir in the direction of the Karakoram…. Between the Karakoram and the Karakash the high Plateau is perhaps rightly described as rather a no-mans land, but I should say with a tendency to become Kashmir property".

Two stages beyond Shahidulla, as the route headed for the Sanju Pass, Forsyth's party crossed the Tughra Su and passed an outpost called Nazr Qurghan. "This is manned by soldiers from Yarkand". In the words of John Lall, "Here we have an early example of coexistence. The Kashmiri and Yarkandi outposts were only two stages apart on either side of the Karakash river..." to the northwest of the Hindutash in the north eastern frontier region of Kashmir. This was the status quo that existed at the time of the mission to Kashgar in 1873–74 by Forsyth. "Elias himself recalled that, following his mission to Kashgar in 1873–74, Sir Douglas Forsyth 'recommended the Maharaja's boundary to be drawn to the north of the Karakash valley as shown in the map accompanying the mission report'. Whether this was ever done is doubtful.

The Qing dynasty quelled the Dungan revolt in 1878. Although the Maharajah of Kashmir apparently indicated a wish to reoccupy the fort at Shahidulla in 1885, he was prevented from doing so by the British and so the territory remained under effective Chinese control.

=== Aftermath ===
Since the reasserting control of the whole region by China in 1878, it has been considered part of Xinjiang and has remained so ever since. Shahidulla is well to the north of any territories claimed by either India or Pakistan, while the Sanju and Kilian passes are further to the north of Shahidulla. A major Chinese road, China National Highway 219, runs from Kargilik (Yecheng) in the Tarim Basin, south through Shahidulla, and across the disputed Aksai Chin region still claimed by India, and into northwestern Tibet Autonomous Region.
