= Kargilik Town =

Kargilik قاغىلىق بازىرى 喀格勒克镇 Yecheng
- Town
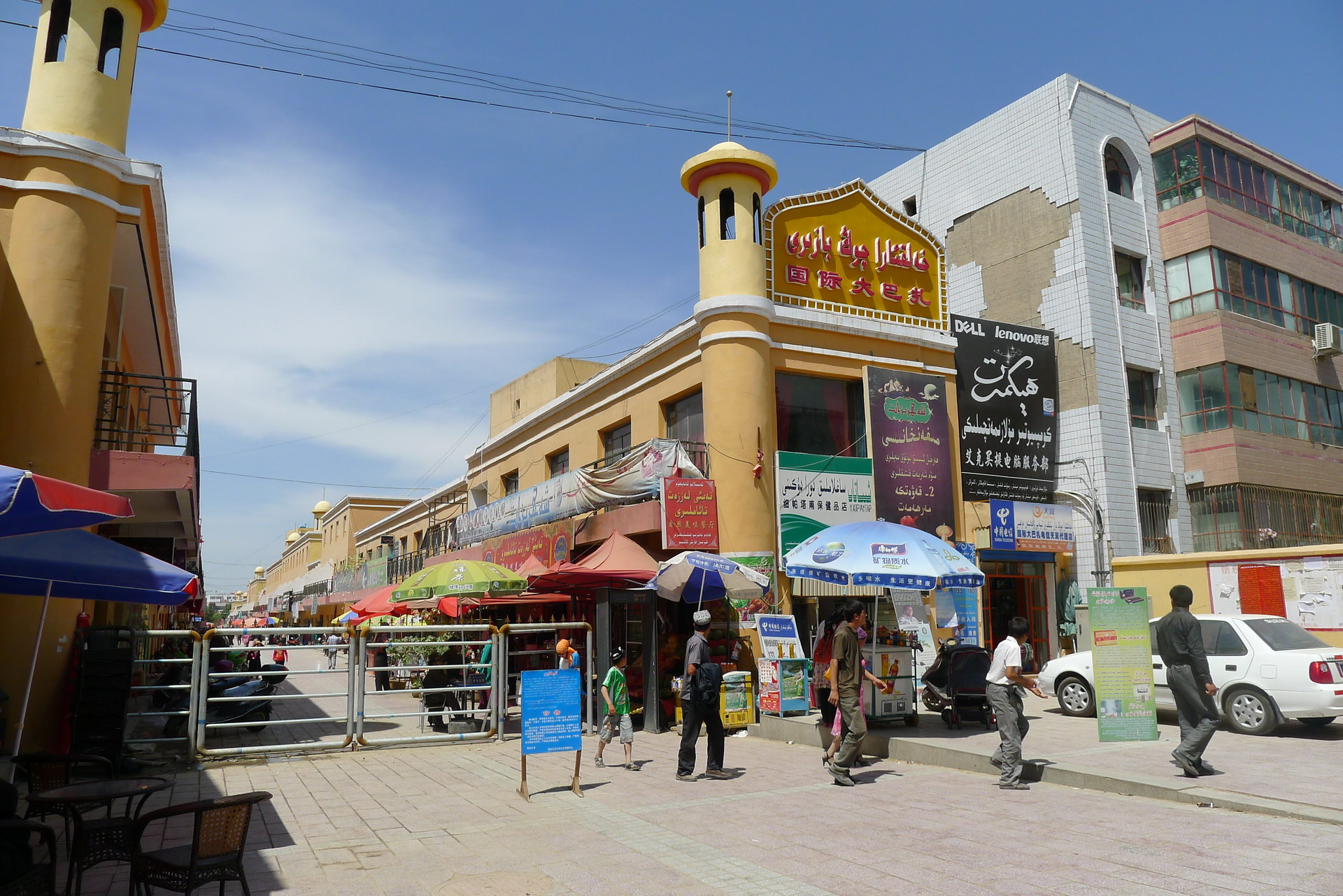

- Location within Southern Xinjiang
- Coordinates: 37°53′6″N 77°24′47″E
- Country: China
- Autonomous region: Xinjiang
- Prefecture: Kashgar Prefecture
- County: Kargilik County

Area
  - Total: 37.5 km^{2} (14.5 sq mi)

Population (2010)
  - Total: 75,730
  - Density: 2,020/km^{2} (5,230/sq mi)

Ethnic groups
  - Major ethnic groups: Uyghur
- Time zone: UTC+8 (China Standard)

Kargilik Town

Chinese name
- Traditional Chinese: 葉城
- Simplified Chinese: 叶城
Transcriptions
Standard Mandarin
- Hanyu Pinyin: Yèchéng
- Wade–Giles: Yeh-ch'êng

Han Dynasty name
- Chinese: 西夜
Transcriptions
Standard Mandarin
- Hanyu Pinyin: Xi yè
- Wade–Giles: Hsi yeh4

Alternate Han Dynasty name
- Chinese: 漂沙
- Literal meaning: Drifting sands
Transcriptions
Standard Mandarin
- Hanyu Pinyin: Piào shā
- Wade–Giles: P'iao4 sha1

Uyghur name
- Uyghur: قاغىلىق
Transcriptions
- Latin Yëziqi: Qaghiliq
- Yengi Yeziⱪ: Ⱪaƣiliⱪ
- SASM/GNC: Kargilik
- Siril Yëziqi: Қағилиқ

Kargilik (Uyghur: قاغىلىق) or Yecheng (Chinese: 叶城) is a town in Xinjiang, China. It is to the southeast of Kashgar, at a distance of 249 km by road and is north of Mazar by 249 km. It is the seat of Kargilik (Yecheng) County.

Kargilik/Yecheng is the name of both the oasis and the town. It is situated on the southern rim of the Taklamakan desert, about halfway between Pishan and Yarkand on the southern route around the Tarim Basin. It is about 50 km north of Kokyar. The rich loess terraces of the oasis are watered by the Tiznaf river and several smaller streams. They are joined to the north by a belt of cultivated land stretching about 40 km from the town of Yecheng to the Yarkand River.

== History ==
During the Former Han period, this place was referred to as Xiye (Chinese: 西夜; Wade–Giles: Hsi-yeh). It was described as having 350 households, 4,000 people and 1,000 men able to bear arms. It was ruled by a king of a neighboring kingdom called Zihe (Chinese: 子合; Wade–Giles: Tzu-ho). In the Later Han period it was apparently known as Piaosha "drifting sands", although that may have been a result of the Xiye being conflated with Pishan (now Guma). Xiye was noted for producing baicao (白草, literally "white grass") which gave a very poisonous substance used on arrow tips – probably from an aconite plant. Xiye is recorded in the Book of the Later Han as being distinct from Zihe and having 2,500 households, more than 10,000 people and 3,000 men able to bear arms.

The Chinese pilgrim monk, Song Yun, passed through the Kingdom of Zhujuban (Chinese: 朱駒半) on his way from Khotan in 519 CE. He described it as being five days' journey around and that it produced much cereal, which was made into cakes. The inhabitants did not allow the slaughter of animals and only ate those which had died a natural death. Many of them lived in the mountains. They resembled the people of Khotan in their language and customs while their writing was like that of the Brahmans from India.

Xuanzang, travelling through the country in 644 CE, described it as being very fertile, with abundant grapes, pears and plums. He said it was more than 1,000 li in circuit, with a capital city measuring more than 10 li around. The writing was like that of Khotan but the spoken language was different. Although he says the people were sincere Buddhists, they had little culture or education and he found them rude and deceitful. Many monasteries were in ruins and the 100 or so monks left were of the Mahayana school. He added that the Mahayana canonical texts were more numerous here than in any other country Buddhism had reached.
It apparently sent an embassy to China at the beginning of the Taiyan period (435-439 CE) and tribute was sent regularly after that. It later fell under the power of the Hephthalites and then the Western Turks. In 639 the ruler sent an embassy to the Chinese court and by 659 was included as part of the region called the "Four Garrisons" by the Chinese after their defeat of the Turkish chief, Duman.
The population were presumably converted to Islam soon after the new religion arrived in the Tarim Basin about 1006 CE.

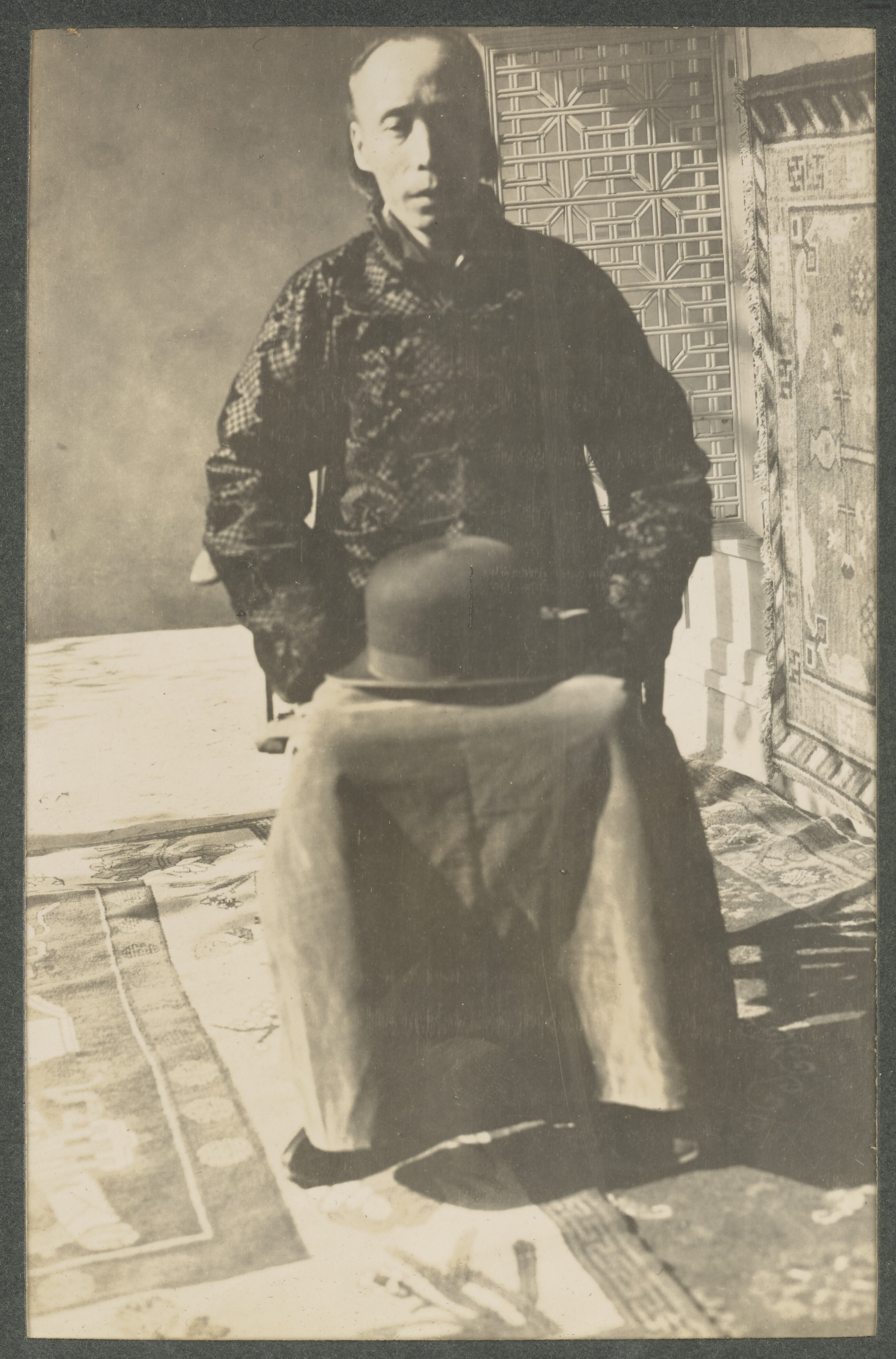
Amban of Kargalik, 1915

During the 1800s, Kargalik contained many foreign slaves who had integrated into the Chinese state. After being freed, many slaves such as Gilgitis in Xinjiang cities like Tashkurgan, Yarkand and Karghallik, stayed rather than return Hunza in Gilgit. Most of these slaves were women who married local slaves and free men and had children with them. Sometimes the women were married to their masters, other slaves or free men who were not their masters. There were ten slave men to slave women married couples and 15 master-female slave couples, with several other non-master free men married to slave women. Both slaves and free Turki and Chinese men fathered children with Hunza slave women. A free man, Khas Muhammad, was married with two children to a female slave named Daulat, aged 24. A Gilgiti slave woman aged 26, Makhmal, was married to a Chinese slave man, Allah Vardi and had three children with him.

In 1979, a number of religious schools were founded by militant group East Turkistan Islamic Movement (ETIM/TIP) founder Abdul Hakeem Makhdoom in Karghalik. These were used to disseminate the movement's ideology among the local population, and were the place where Hasan Mahsum, who would later go on to revive and lead the militant group, studied from 1984 to 1989.

In 1994, the Chinese character name for the town was set as Kageleke (喀格勒克镇).

On 28 February 2012, ethnic Uyghurs, wielding knives, attacked a market in Yecheng, killing 13 people, mostly ethnic Han. The police shot & killed the seven Uyghur attackers.

== Geography ==
Kargilik Town is located on the alluvial fan of the Tizinafu River located in the northern part of Kargilik County. Chasa Meschit Township (Qiasameiqite, Qiasimiqiti) surrounds Kargilik Town on the north, east and south. To the west, the town borders Yitimliqum Township (Yitimukong).

== Administrative Divisions ==
As of 2019, Kargilik Town included fifty-two residential communities: (Mandarin Chinese pinyin-derived names)

- Agezikangboyi (阿格孜康博依社区), Boxirekekuoqia (伯西热克阔恰社区), Bage'airekeboyi (巴格艾日克博依社区), Anjiangmaili (安江买里社区), Qipandai'erwazha (棋盘代尔瓦扎社区), Xicheng (西城社区), Bagemaili (巴格买里社区), Lanqiao (蓝桥社区), Linggongli (零公里社区), Xincheng (新城社区), Xingfunanlu (幸福南路社区), Yawage (亚瓦格社区), Hongqiao (虹桥社区), Xinshiji (新世纪社区), Jiefangbeilu (解放北路社区), Xingfuyuan (幸福苑社区), Langan (栏杆社区), Dongfanghong (东方红社区), Huochezhan (火车站社区), Yucailu (育才路社区), Youligunjiayi (尤里滚加依社区), Tugeman'airekeboyi (吐格曼艾热克博依社区), Kasike'aireke (卡斯克艾热克社区), Yabixi (亚比西社区), Tuguqikuoqia (吐古其阔恰社区), Gongyuan (公园社区), Wusitangboyi (乌斯塘博依社区), Hongqi (红旗社区), Tianyuan (田园社区), Jinguo (金果社区), Tuanjie (团结社区), Anakuoqia (阿那阔恰社区), Qiman (奇曼社区), Gongluhuayuan (公路花苑社区), Chahua (茶花社区), Qipandonglu (棋盘东路社区), Wuhaozha (五号闸社区), Yuecheng (越程社区), Kunlun (昆仑社区), Qingnianlu (青年路社区), Youyilu (友谊路社区), Shuangyonglu (双拥路社区), Alilu (阿里路社区), Aimin (爱民社区), Yusaisi (玉赛斯社区), Donghuanlu (东环路社区), Xueyu (雪域社区), Yuanlin (园林社区), Nanhuanlu (南环路社区), Huimin (惠民社区), Changhe (昌和社区), Jingguan (景观社区)

As of 2009:

- Agezikangboyi 阿格孜康博依社区 Boxirekekuoqia 伯西热克阔恰社区 Bage'airikeboyi 巴格艾日克博依社区 Anjiangmaili 安江买里社区 Qipandai'erwazha 棋盘代尔瓦扎社区 Bageqia 巴格恰社区 Bagemaili 巴格买里社区 Lanqiao 蓝桥社区 Linggongli 零公里社区

== Economy ==
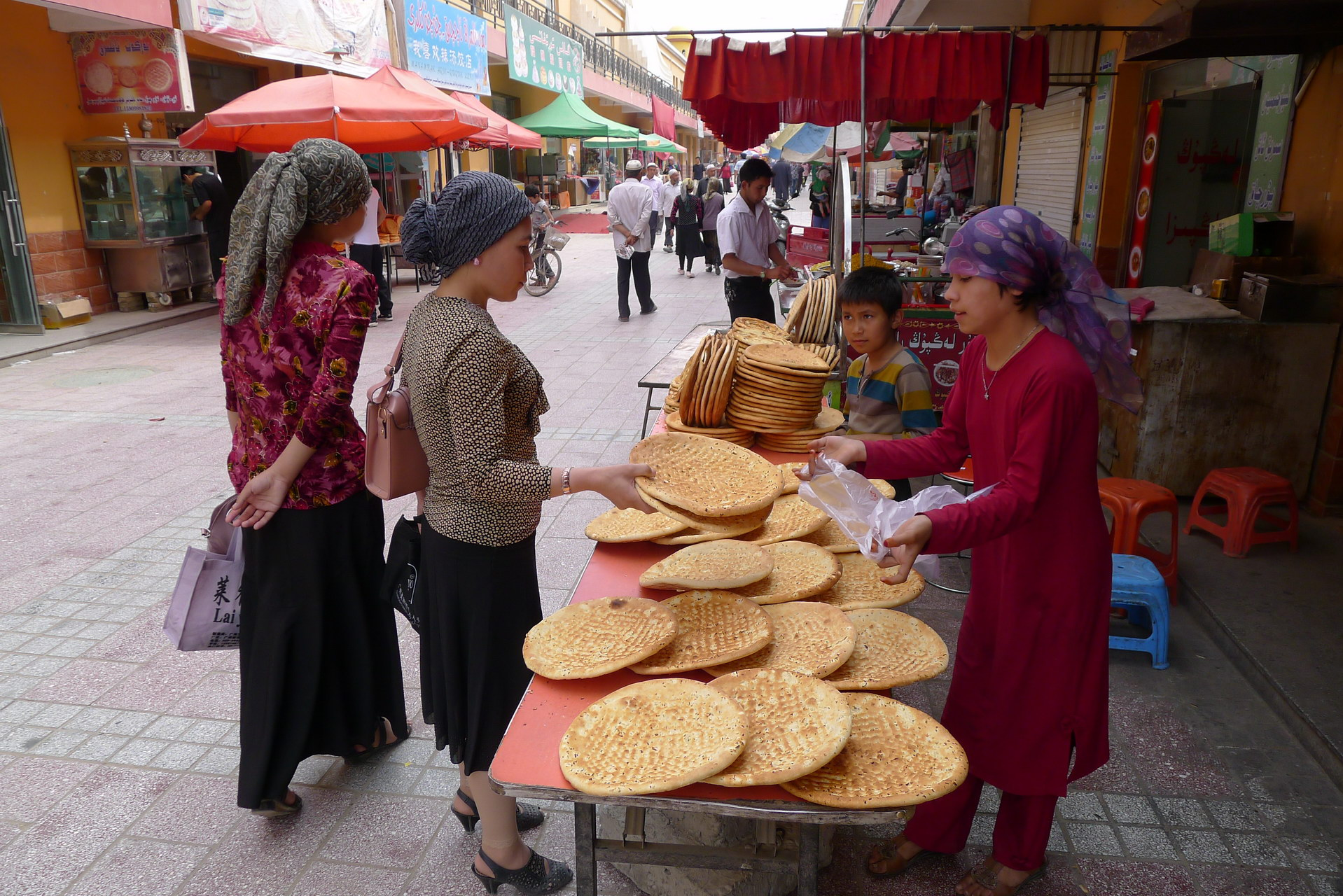
Bazaar of Kargilik

In earlier times it was important as the usual starting-point for caravans to India, through the Pamirs, via Tashkurghan, or through Ladakh by the Karakoram passes.

Today there is a small town with a market, some shops and a bank. Large-scale irrigation has transformed huge areas of desert into productive agricultural land. Yecheng is the main centre for Chinese immigration into western Xinjiang and it has become quite a large, sprawling town.

The total economic output of the town for that year of 2011 was valued at 309,812,200 CNY.

== Demographics ==
Historical population
Year	Pop.	±% p.a.
2000	59,260	—
2010	75,730	+2.48%

As of 1997, 78.7% of the residents of the town were Uyghur.

== Transportation ==
Yecheng is served by China National Highways 219, 315 and the Kashgar-Hotan Railway.

== See also ==
- List of township-level divisions of Xinjiang
