= Kunlun Volcanic Group =

Volcanic field in northwestern Tibet

- Location within China

Highest point
- Elevation: 5,808 m (19,055 ft)
- Coordinates: 35°46′15″N 81°37′18″E

Geography
- Location: China, Kunlun Mountains

Geology
- Mountain type: Pyroclastic cones
- Last eruption: 27 May 1951

Kunlun Volcanic Group (Chinese: 昆仑火山群), also known as Ashiköli Volcanic Field (Chinese: 阿什库勒火山), is a volcanic field in northwestern Tibet. Eight other volcanic fields are also in the area. The field is within a basin that also contains three lakes.

Volcanism in the field has produced lavas and cones, with rocks having varying compositions dominated by trachyandesite. Volcanism in the field may be influenced by faults in the area.

The dates obtained from the field range from 5.0 ± 0.6 million years ago to 74,000 ± 4,000 years ago. An eruption of Ashi volcano was observed in 1951, making this one of China's youngest volcanoes.

== Geological context ==
The Tibetan Plateau formed through the collision of India with Eurasia. Potassium-rich volcanic activity in the Tibetan Plateau has been occurring since 50 million years ago. After 8 million years ago, this volcanism occurred mainly in northwestern Tibet. It is not clear why volcanism occurs in the Tibetan plateau considering that the area is dominated by the collision between continents rather than subduction, which happens in other volcanically active areas. Southward subduction of the Asian Plate and the northward one of the Indian Plate have been found. Mélange from these subducting plates forms the source material of the magmas of the volcanic fields in northwestern Tibet, although isotope data suggest that the Ashikule magma may not derive from subduction. Magma generation in Ashikule could have been affected by garnet or garnet-containing crustal layers. More generally, the crust beneath northern and central Tibet is suspected to be partially molten between 55–60 kilometres (34–37 mi) of depth.

Rocks younger than 350,000 years have been found in the Tengchong system in the southeast and the Ashikule plateau in the northwestern part of Tibet. These are also the only volcanic systems with Holocene activity in Tibet. The volcanic areas of northwestern Tibet for the most part are situated at over 4,500 metres (14,800 ft) altitude and are poorly accessible.

The Ashikule volcanic field is one among nine in northwestern Tibet, other volcanic fields are Dahongliutan, Heishibei, Kangxiwa, Keriya, Pulu, Qitai Daban, Quanshuigou and Tianshuihai. Some of these volcanic centres are occasionally grouped with Ashikule in the Yutian-Yumen volcanic zone. A pronounced seismic velocity anomaly in southern Tarim may be associated with the volcanism at Ashikule, and a seismically imaged gap between the Tarim block and the Indian Plate below the crust may be a pathway for mantle upwelling that feeds the Ashikule volcanoes.

== Geography ==
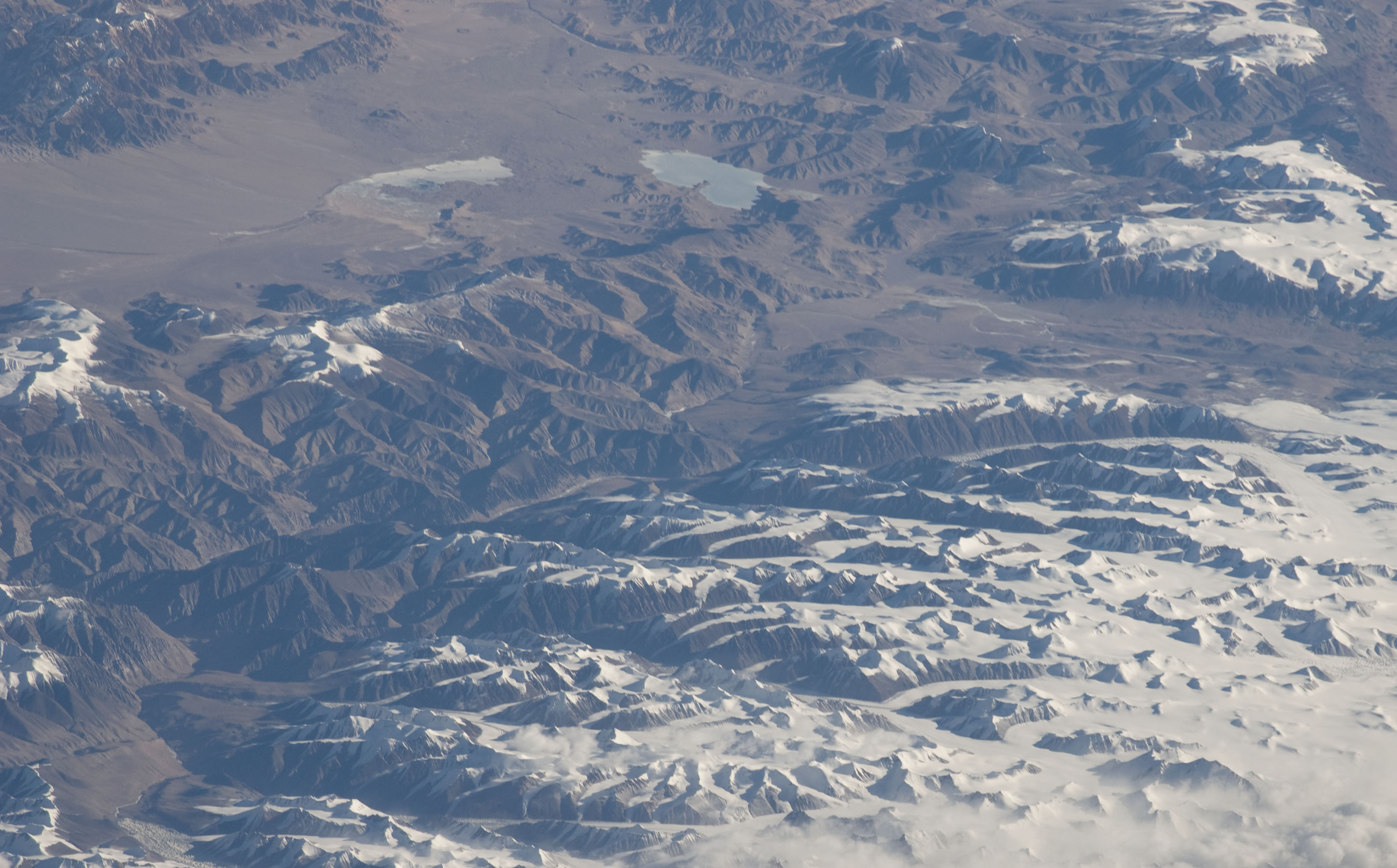
Liushi Shan (foreground), lakes of Ashiköl Volcanic Field

The Ashikule volcanic field is located in the Kunlun Shan, 131 kilometres (81 mi) south of Yutian County, Xinjiang. It is one of the highest volcanic regions in the world and being remote and with a harsh climate, poorly researched. It occupies the southern parts of a large pull apart basin, the Ashikule Basin in the western Kunlun. This basin covers a surface area of 700 square kilometres (270 sq mi) at an altitude of 4,700 metres (15,400 ft), sloping southeastward. East-west stretching of the crust may play a role in volcanic activity there. The numerous strike slip faults in the area could be involved too, whereas subduction of the Tarim Basin beneath the Kunlun is unlikely. The Altyn Tagh fault crosses the field in east-northeast to south-southwest direction, and several other fault zones such as the Kangxiwa fault pass north of the basin; they are involved in the genesis of the Ashikule basin.

== Geomorphology ==
There are 11 or 14 principal volcanoes in Ashikule, formed by lava, pumice and pyroclastics, with a total volume of about 20 cubic kilometres (4.8 cu mi). Spatter cones and volcanoes of Quaternary age are in the Ashikule area, for a total amount of over 70 cones. Over 20 volcanoes have been found in the eastern part of the field, they reach heights of several 100 metres (330 ft). It features perfectly preserved cinder cones. Silicic lava domes are also found. The Ashikule basin is covered by 250 square kilometres (97 sq mi)-200 square kilometres (77 sq mi) of lava from this field. Various kinds of rock coatings have developed on these lavas, some of biogenic origin. The entire field covers a surface of about 4,820 square kilometres (1,860 sq mi).

Xi Shan is the westernmost volcano with a diameter of 500 metres (1,600 ft) and a height of 25–30 metres (82–98 ft) With a summit height of 5,104.6 metres (16,747 ft) and a height of 400 metres (1,300 ft) above base, Dahei Shan volcano is the highest volcano at Ashikule and features a V-shaped crater. 80 metres (260 ft) high Wuluke cone north of Wukule lake features a crater lake and has sent out many lava flows, some of which entered Wuluke lake. Migong Shan is east of Wuluke volcano. Yueya Shan has a 60 metres (200 ft) high secondary cone within its 300 metres (980 ft) wide crater; Maoniu Shan volcano is located nearby and they are surrounded by even smaller centres. Heilong Shan is a long volcanic ridge on the terraces of the Akesu River and to the east of it is the horseshoe-shaped Mati Shan and the 7–8 metres (23–26 ft) high Dong Shan. Other volcanoes are known as Binhushan, Gaotaishan, Yinshan and Yizishan.

The trachyandesitic Ashi volcano, also known as Ka-er-daxi or Vulkan, (35.69885°N 81.57623°E,) is south of Ashikule lake in a lava plateau, at an altitude of 4,868 metres (15,971 ft). The 350 metres (1,150 ft) wide cone features an uneroded 120 metres (390 ft) high cone with a 50 metres (160 ft) deep crater breached to the south. Lava flows from Ashi extend both north and south and cover a surface area of 33 square kilometres (13 sq mi), reaching as far as lake Ashikule.

There are three salt lakes in the area, Ashikule (also called Ashi or Aqqikkol), Shagesikule, and Wulukekule (also called Wuluke or Ulugkol). Ashi is 5.5 kilometres (3.4 mi) long and Urukele 7 kilometres (4.3 mi). 40 metres (130 ft) deep Ashikule covers a surface area of 14 square kilometres (5.4 sq mi) and formed when a valley was dammed by lava. Wulukekule and Ashikule are separated from each other by lava. Between 13,000 and 11,000 years ago Ashikule and Shagesikule were one lake. Playas of the same name are found in the area and are a source of mineral dust. The basin is in the area of the upper Keriya River.

== Composition ==
The field is dominated by trachyandesite and trachydacite, ranging from tephrite over trachyandesite to trachyte and rhyolite. Ashi volcano has erupted trachyandesite. Phenocrysts in the rocks contain clinopyroxene, olivine, orthopyroxene and phlogopite. Xenoliths of gneiss are found in the rocks of Ashi volcano.

Ashikule and Tengchong have high ratios of thorium to uranium in their composition. Thorium isotope data indicate that in comparison with the volcanoes of the Tengchong area, Ashikule volcanoes formed by slower melting of rocks. The magmas of Ashikule probably did not form under the influence of water metasomatism. The ultimate source rocks may be mafic-ultramafic rocks. The magma of Ashi volcano formed by the mixing of trachyandesitic magma with a more silicic component.

The conditions in the magma chamber of Ashi volcano have been estimated. There are two populations of rocks, one formed at temperatures of 1,135–1,176 °C (2,075–2,149 °F) at a depth of 18–25 kilometres (11–16 mi), the other at temperatures of 1,104–1,143 °C (2,019–2,089 °F) at a depth of 13–18 kilometres (8.1–11.2 mi).

== Climate ==
The Ashikule basin is one of the driest areas of Tibet.

Discrepancies between dates obtained by surface exposure dating and potassium-argon dating on some rocks have been interpreted as being due to lava flows being covered by snow and ice in the past. From this it has been inferred that the Ashikule field was covered by glaciers during the Last Glacial Maximum, when temperatures decreased by 6–9 °C (11–16 °F).

== Geochronology ==
Some ages are 5.0 ± 0.6 and 2.7 ± 1.8 million years ago and were obtained by argon-argon dating. Xi Shan volcano formed 2.8 million years ago. Mati Shan and a volcanic episode 120 kilometres (75 mi) north of Ashikule occurred 1.63-1.21 million years ago. Most volcanoes formed 670,000 - 500,000 years ago, two other minor episodes occurred 440,000 - 280,000 and 200,000 - 120,000 years ago. Gaotaishan volcano is one million years and Binhushan volcano 370,000 years old. A burst of volcanic activity took place 270,000 years ago, forming several volcanoes, and Ashi and Wuluke cone erupted around 113,000 years ago. Most of the lava flows around Ashi were erupted 66,000 years ago. Sediments underlying volcanic rocks have ages of 9,700-6,700 years, indicating that eruptions took place during the Holocene.

The latest eruption was on 27 May 1951, at Ashi volcano as was reported by the newspaper Xinjiang Daily. The report claimed that soldiers building a road heard roaring and saw a column of smoke, which continued for several days. A volcanic ash layer from this eruption has been found in the Changce Ice Cap, whereas the occurrence of lava flows at that time is unclear and no rocks in the field itself have been conclusively linked to the eruption.

Another unconfirmed report claims an eruption took place in the 19th century. Presently, the field is dormant and there is no evidence for the presence of a magma chamber (magmas may come from the mantle, however) nor of any ongoing deformation. Fumarolic activity has been observed in the northern side of the crater of Ashi volcano. It is one of the few active volcanic regions in China.

The magnitude 7.2 2008 Yutian earthquake took place 30 kilometres (19 mi) south of the volcanic field, at the intersection of two major faults, the Karakax fault and the Altyn-Tagh fault. Other earthquakes occurred in 2012 and 2014. Volcanic activity may also be related to the Longmu-Gozha fault system; conversely some volcanic landforms have been deformed by faulting.
