= Heishibeihu =

Volcanic field in Tibet

- Location within China

Highest point
- Elevation: 6,900 m (22,600 ft)
- Coordinates: 35.47°N 82.92°E

Heishibeihu is a volcanic field in the Kunlun Mountains of China.

The field lies in the western Kunlun Mountains. Volcanism took place in the region during the Tertiary and Quaternary, with Quaternary volcanism occurring north of the earlier volcanism. Regional active faults influence the location of volcanism, such as the Kangxiwar fault; some faults in the area are still active and caused earthquakes like one on the 26 June 2020. The volcanic field geologically belongs to the Songpan-Ganzi Terrane.

The field covers an area of 355 square kilometres (137 sq mi) with about 28.4 cubic kilometres (6.8 cu mi) of rock that reaches a thickness of about 80 metres (260 ft). It consists of three units: The first basaltic unit developed southeast of Lake Heishi Beihu around a volcanic cone. The second unit formed several volcanic cones south and southwest of the lake, consisting of trachyandesite. The third, trachytic, unit forms the southwestern shore of the lake. Volcanic activity seems to have decreased over time.

Eruptions commenced about 9.23 million years ago according to potassium-argon dating; thermoluminescence dating has yielded an age of 67,000 years for the most recent eruptions and Heishibeihu is considered to be the most recently active volcano in the Tibetan Plateau. Seismic tomography has identified mantle upwelling below the volcanic field, which is linked to the subduction of the Indian Plate. Heishi Lake lies at an elevation of 5,048 metres (16,562 ft) and has a surface area of 100.55 square kilometres (38.82 sq mi); the volcanoes surround the lake. Mountain peaks over 6,000 metres (20,000 ft) high occur in the region.

Volcanic fields in the area include Kangxiwar, Dahongliutan, Quanshuigou and Heishibeihu in the south and north Pulu, east Pulu and Ashikule volcanic field in the south. They feature mainly lava flows forming terraces and platforms, with craters and pyroclastics uncommon. Latite bearing olivine is the most common volcanic rock and other rocks include leucite, phonolithic tephrite, trachybasalt and trachyte. Paleogene rocks and Quaternary river sediments underlie volcanic rocks, which were emplaced over lake sediments. The magma forming these volcanoes formed either through shear heating of the lithosphere, slab dynamics heating the lithosphere, or from upwelled asthenosphere. They then undergo differentiation during ascent as they pool in magma chamber, with each of the three stages coming from a particular differentiation process.
