= Hindutash Pass =

Mountain pass in Xinjiang, China

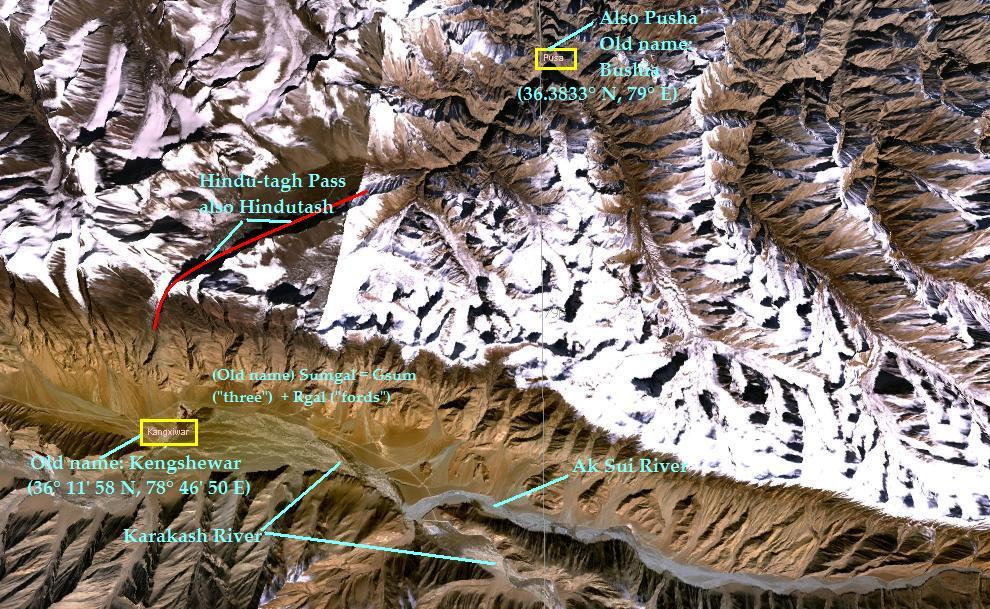
- NASA satellite image showing the towns of Kangxiwar and Pusa in southwestern Xinjiang, China and the Hindu-tagh Pass connecting them. The pass is marked in bright red.

- Location within Southern Xinjiang
- Interactive map of Hindutash Pass
- Elevation: 5,450 metres (17,880 ft)
- Traversed by: G580 (under construction)

Third Approach
- Location: Hotan County, Xinjiang, China
- Range: Kunlun Mountains
- Coordinates: 36°16′23″N 78°46′50″E

Hindutash Pass

Chinese name
- Traditional Chinese: 印地他什達坂
- Simplified Chinese: 印地他什达坂
Transcriptions
Standard Mandarin
- Hanyu Pinyin: Yìndì-tāshí dábǎn

Uyghur name
- Uyghur: ھىندۇتاش ئېغىزى

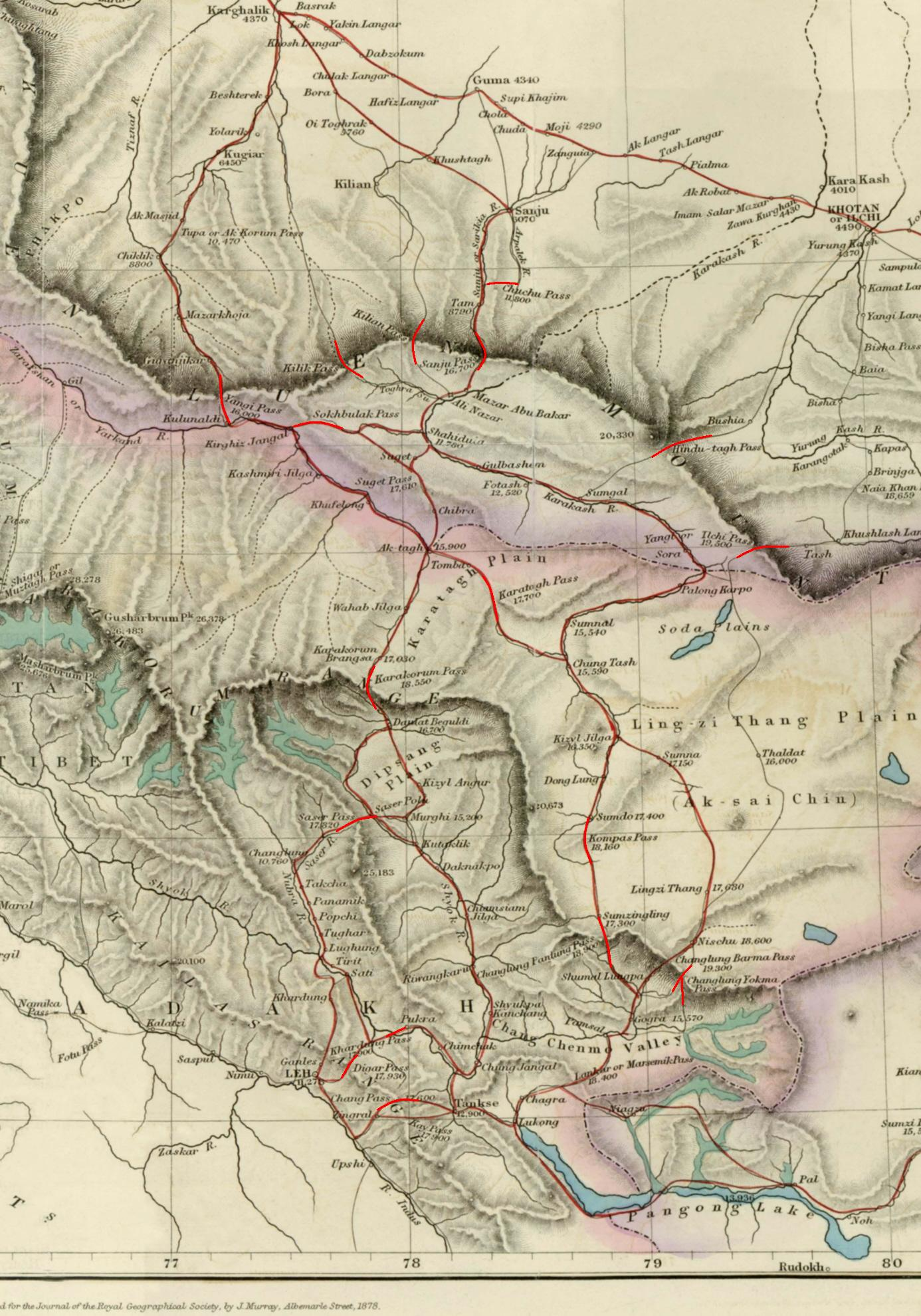
Details of a map of Central Asia (1878) showing the Hindu-tagh Pass and Khotan in Xinjiang as well as the northern border regions of the British Indian Empire (which included the Kashmir region). The international border is shown in the two-toned purple and pink band. The mountain passes are shown in bright red. Warning the lat/long information is not everywhere correct.

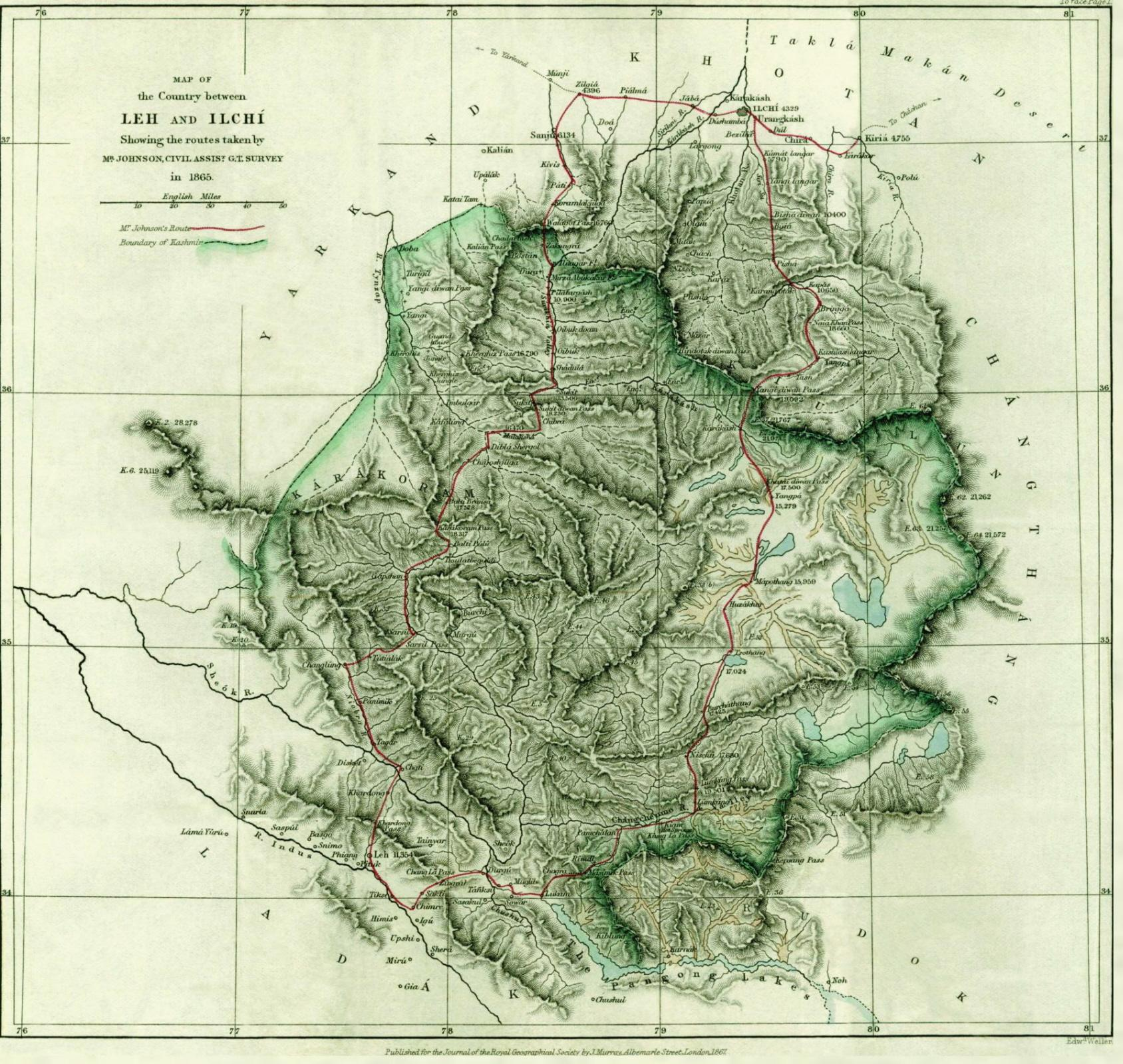
Map of W. H. Johnson showing the route of his trip to Khotan from Leh; in this map, Johnson refers to the pass as "Hindotak diwan Pass." He himself traveled through the Yangi diwan Pass, some 30 km (20 mi) upriver from Hindutash, on his outward journey, and returned via the Sanju diwan Pass near Shahdula. Johnson placed the border of Kashmir with Turkistan at Bringja. (Refer accompanying maps for position of Bringja)

Hindu-tagh Pass, also known as Hindutash, is a historical mountain pass in the western Xinjiang, China. The pass cuts through the Kunlun Mountains connecting the now-deserted town of Kangxiwar in the Karakash River valley to the town of Pusha in the Pusha Jilga valley (36.3833°N 79°E; formerly Bushia). It also connects to the road to the city of Hotan (formerly Khotan or Ilchi; see adjacent maps).

G580 is under construction connecting Kangxiwar directly with Hotan. It will tunnel under Hindutash, connect with the Xinjiang-Tibet Highway G219 to the south after numerous hairpin turns. It is scheduled to be completed in 2022.

"Hindu-tagh" means "Indian Mountain," and "Hindu-tash," "Indian stone" in the Uyghur dialect of Xinjiang.

== History ==
In 1857, the explorer Robert Schlagintweit crossed this pass from camping grounds in Sumgal ("three fords"), on the banks of the Karakash river, approximately 7 miles (11 km) upstream from Kengshewar and estimated its height to be 17,879 ft (5,450 m). At the top of the pass (36°16′23″N 78°46′50″E), there is a steep glacier with many crevasses. The eastern Kunlun range, which is in the southern region of the Hotan prefecture of Xinjiang, is cut by two other passes: the Sanju Pass, near the small staging post of Xaidulla, formerly Shahidulla, northwest of Hindu-tagh, and the Ilchi Pass, southeast of Hindu-tagh, just north-east of the village of Dahongliutan, itself just north of the now disputed Aksai Chin area (see second map on right). The former pass had been much used historically, and provided the traditional means of entry from the south into the ancient Kingdom of Khotan. The latter was traversed in 1865 by W. H. Johnson of the Survey of India.

== Gallery ==
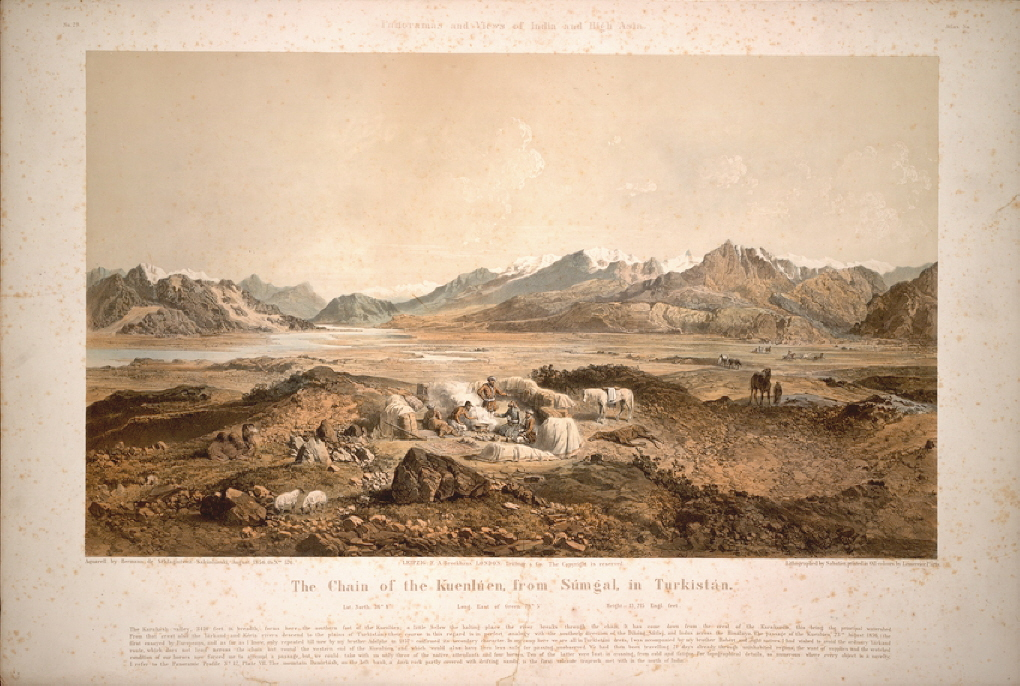
"The Chain of the Kuenlúen, from Súmgal, in Turkistán (Lat North 36° 8', Long. East of Green. 78° 5', Height 13, 215 Engl. feet)" by Hermann Schlagintweit, August 1856. Lithographed by Sabatier, printed in oil-colours by Lemereier, Paris. The Hindu-tagh Pass is the break in the mountains on the right.

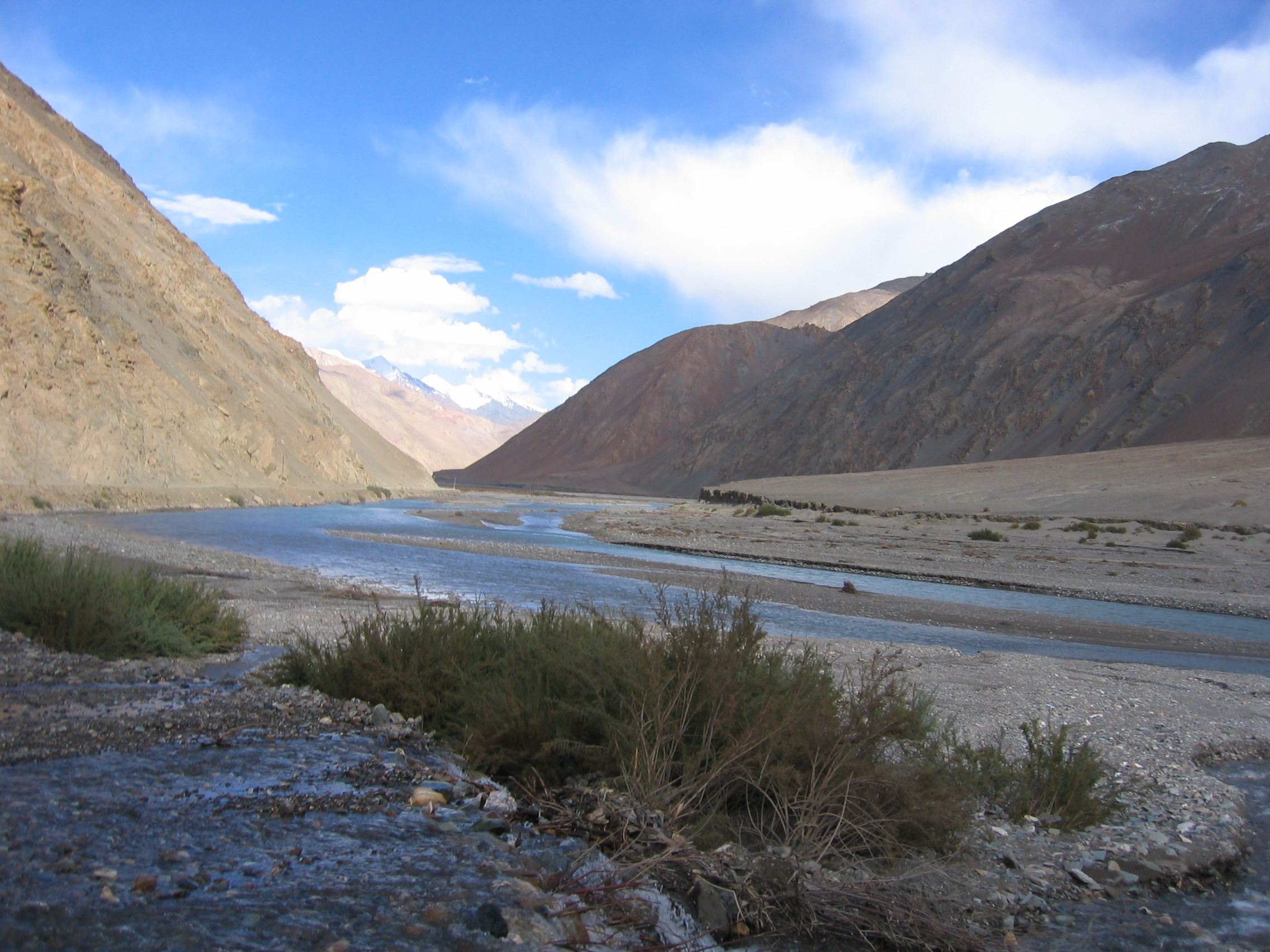
Yarkand River in the Western Kunlun Range, seen from the Xinjiang-Tibet Highway

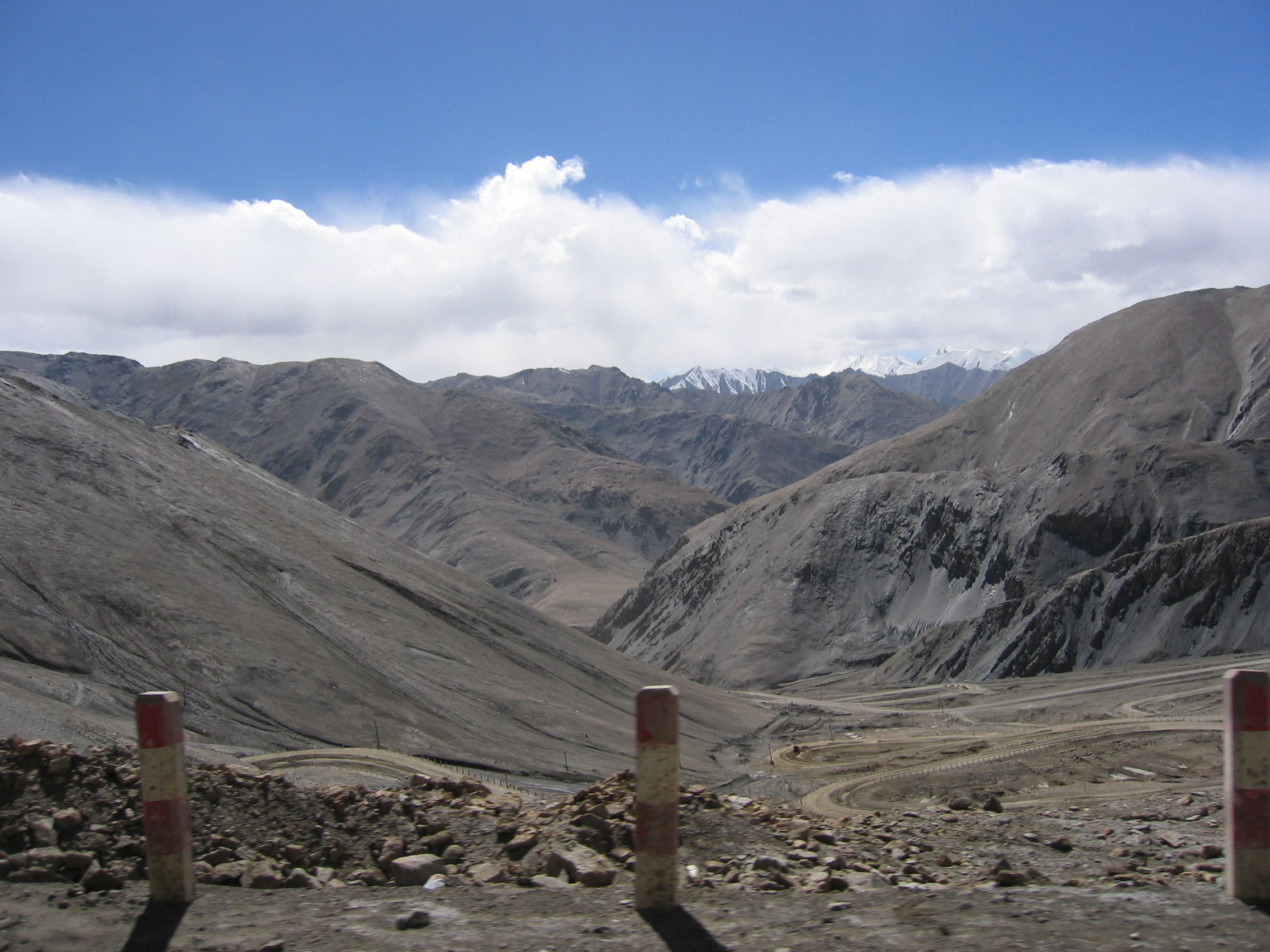
View of Western Kunlun Range from the Xinjiang-Tibet Highway

== Maps ==
A lower-resolution 1909 Map of the Princely State of Kashmir and Jammu. Sumgal in the valley below the Hindu-tagh Pass is shown in the top right corner.

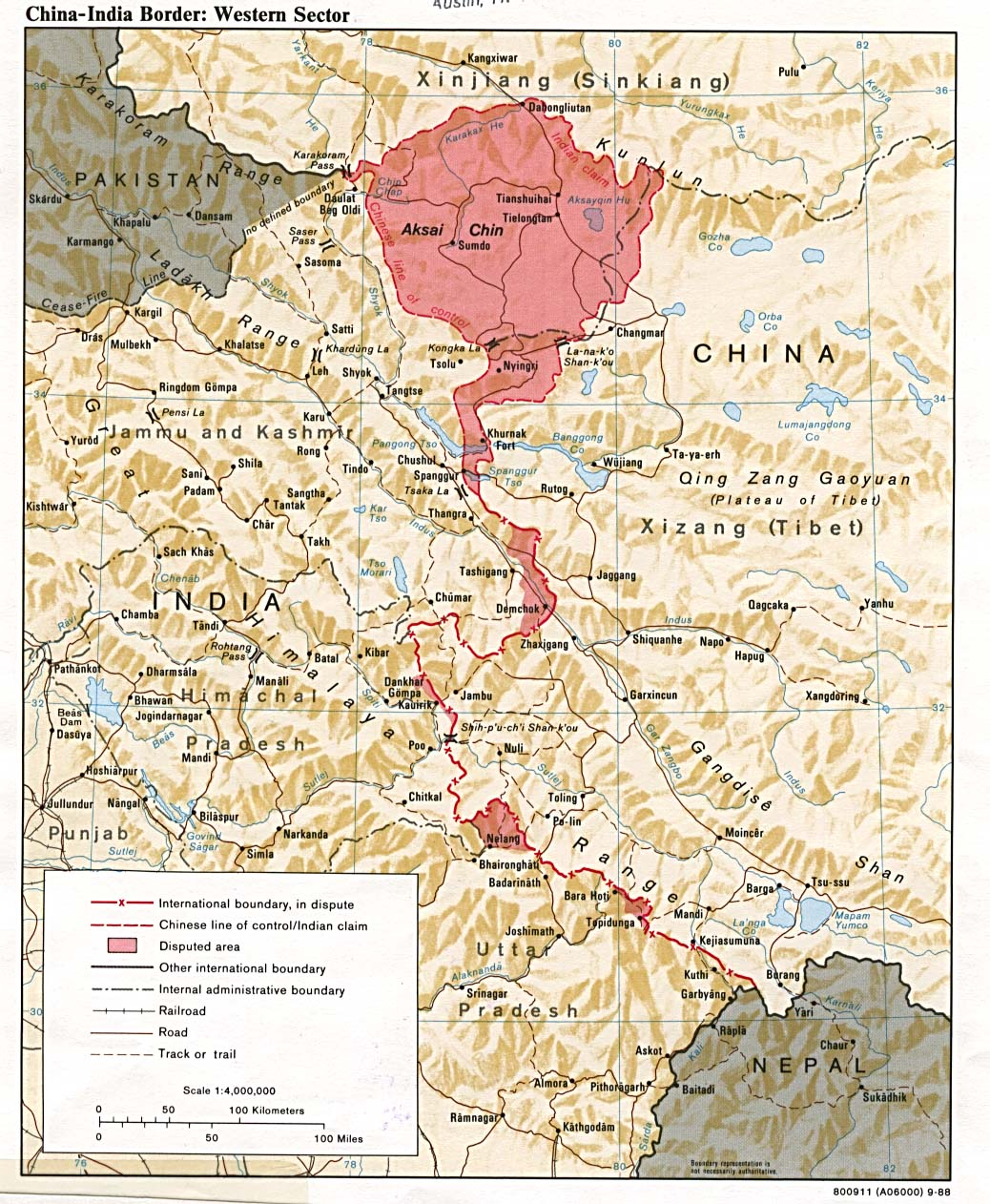
1988 CIA map of Aksai Chin. Hindutash is just north of the town of Kangxiwar, Xinjiang shown at the top of the map, north of Aksai Chin.

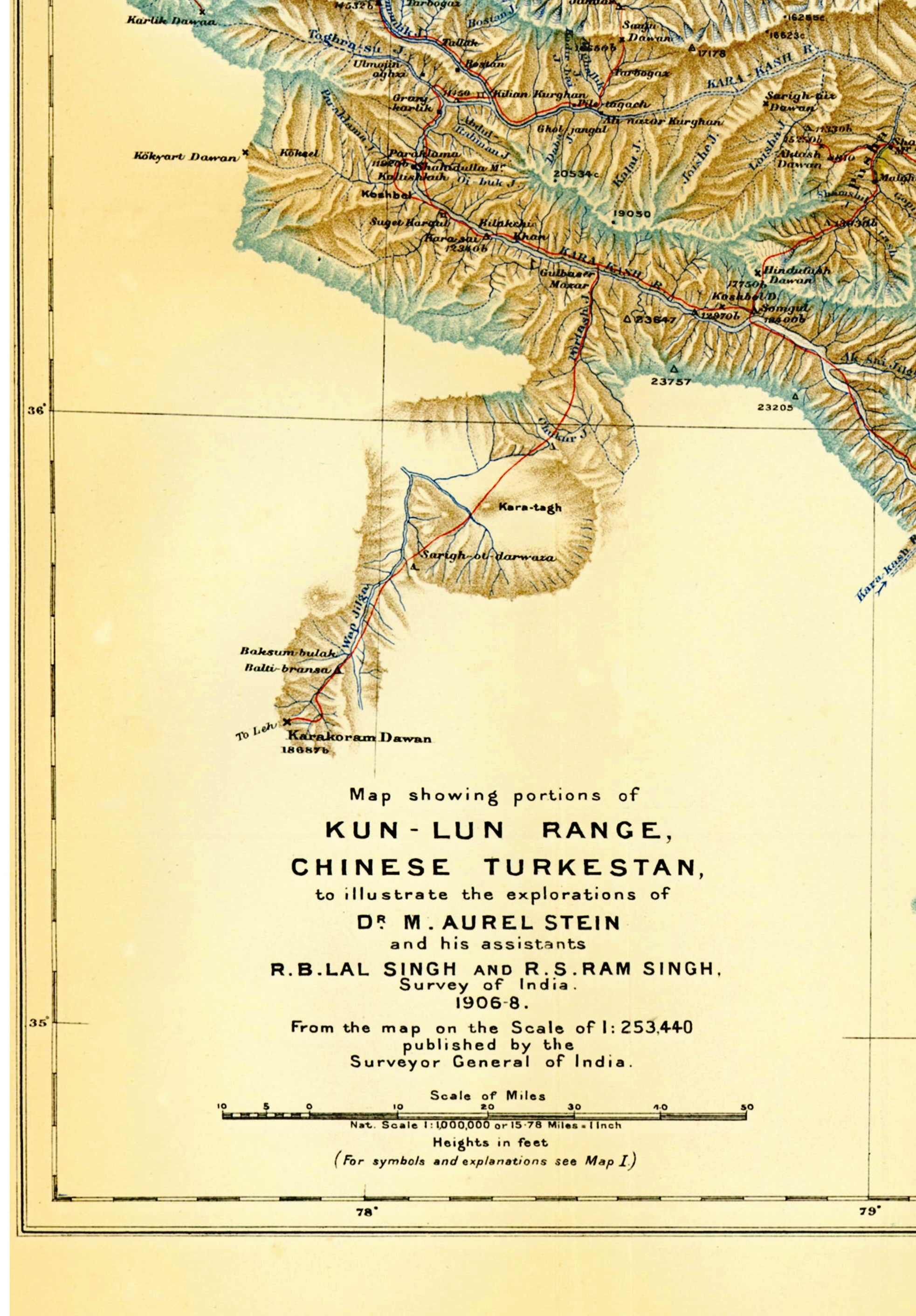
Map of Aurel Stein (1911) based on that of the Survey of India showing the "Hindutash Dawan" in the Kunlun Mountains

== See also ==
- Xinjiang
- Aksai Chin
- Kunlun Mountains
- Yurungkash
- Karakash River
