= China National Highway 580 =

Road in China

National Highway 580
- 580国道

Major junctions
- From: Aksu
- G217 Aral; G315 Hotan
- To: G219 Kangxiwar

Location
- Country: China

Highway system
- National Trunk Highway System; Primary; Auxiliary
← G579	→ G581

China National Highway 580 will run from Aksu in Xinjiang to Kangxiwar, also in Xinjiang. As of 2021 the route is still partially under construction and scheduled to be completed in 2022. The route will traverse the Hindutash through a tunnel.

== See also ==
- Tarim Desert Highway
