= He'an County =

He'an County 和安县
- County
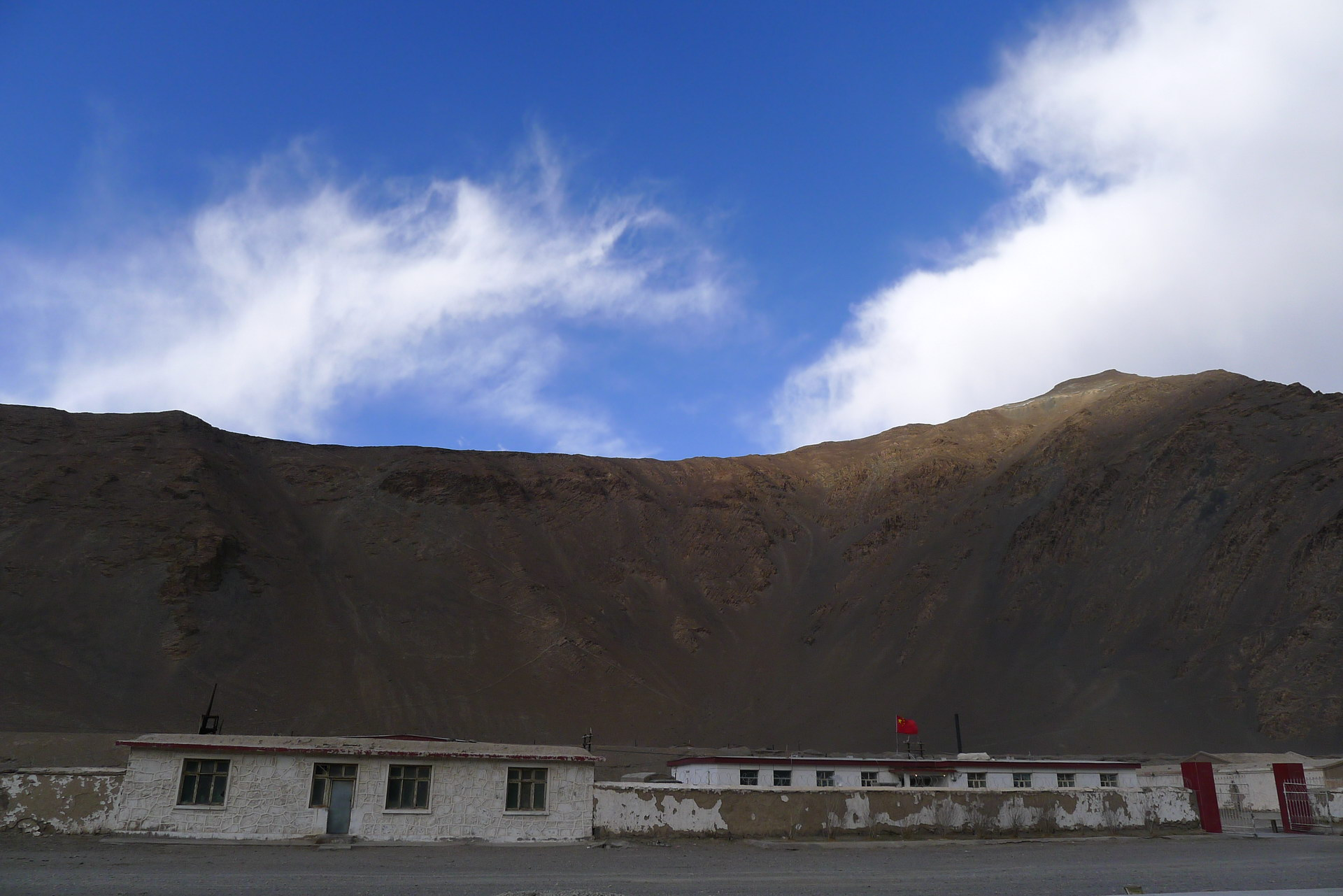
- Army service station in Dahongliutan
- Interactive map of He'an County
- Coordinates: 35°58′46″N 79°11′40″E
- Country: China
- Province: Xinjiang
- Prefecture-level city: Hotan
- County seat: Dahongliutan
- Elevation: 4,200 m (13,800 ft)
- Time zone: UTC+8 (China Standard)

He'an County

Chinese name
- Simplified Chinese: 和安县
- Traditional Chinese: 和安縣
Transcriptions
Standard Mandarin
- Hanyu Pinyin: Hé'ān Xiàn

Uyghur name
- Uyghur: قىزىليۇلغۇن ناھىيىسى
Transcriptions
- Latin Yëziqi: Qizilyulghun Nahiyisi

He'an County (Chinese: 和安; pinyin: Hé'ān) is a county in the southwest of the Xinjiang Uyghur Autonomous Region and is under the administration of the Hotan Prefecture. It is the southernmost county-level division of Xinjiang. It administers part of Aksai Chin.

The county government is seated in the town of Dahongliutan (or simply Hongliu), which is located at an elevation of 4,200 meters above sealevel.

== History ==
The people's government of northwest China's Xinjiang Uygur Autonomous Region announced the establishment of He'an County on 27 December 2024. The establishment of the county, administered by Hotan Prefecture, was approved by the Central Committee of the Chinese Communist Party and the State Council of the People's Republic of China. In response to the creation of the county, Ministry of External Affairs of India spokesperson Randhir Jaiswal stated that India "never accepted the illegal Chinese occupation of Indian territory in this area" and "creation of new counties will neither have a bearing on India's long-standing and consistent position regarding our sovereignty over the area nor lend legitimacy to China's illegal and forcible occupation of the same." India, which considers Aksai Chin as Indian territory under Chinese occupation, issued protest regarding the creation of the county with the Chinese side through diplomatic channels.

== Transportation ==
- China National Highway 219, which passes through the disputed Aksai Chin region
