= Kangxiwar =

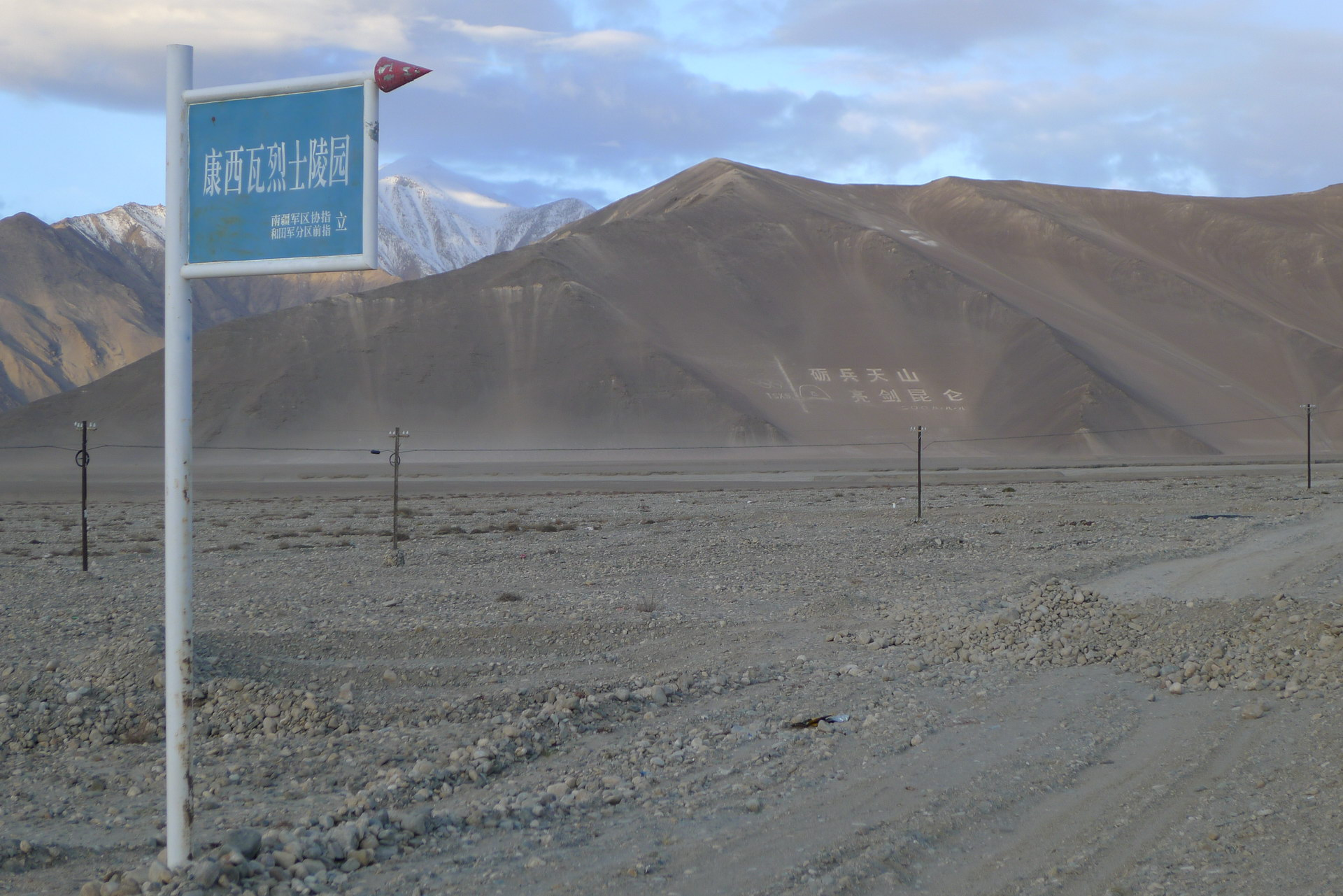
- Kangxiwar memorial signage

- Location within Southern Xinjiang
- Coordinates: 36°12′20″N 78°45′45″E
- Country: China
- Region: Xinjiang
- Prefecture: Hotan Prefecture
- County: Pishan County
- Township: Xaidulla
- Elevation: 4,000 m (13,000 ft)

Kangxiwar

Chinese name
- Traditional Chinese: 康西瓦
- Simplified Chinese: 康西瓦
Transcriptions
Standard Mandarin
- Hanyu Pinyin: Kāngxīwǎ

Uyghur name
- Uyghur: كەڭشىۋەر
Transcriptions
- Latin Yëziqi: kengshiwer

Kangxiwar (Chinese: 康西瓦; pinyin: Kāng xī wǎ; Uyghur: كەڭشىۋەر) (Note: Alternative spellings include Kengshewar, Kangshiwar, Kangxiwa and Kang Xiwa.) is the location of a deserted town on the southwest side of the Kunlun Mountains. It is on the bank of the Karakash River in the western Xinjiang Uyghur Autonomous Region of the People's Republic of China. It is also the base of the route to Hotan from the Karakash valley via the Hindutash pass. According to Chinese sources, Kangxiwar means "place with mine" in Uyghur.

During the Sino-Indian War of 1962, Kangxiwar served as the forward headquarters for the Xinjiang Military Command. The military cemetery of those killed in the war is still located here. There is also a highway maintenance crew house at Kangxiwar at the present time. China National Highway 219 (G219), the Xinjiang-Tibet Highway, runs through here. Following the G219 southeast will lead to Dahongliutan and Tianshuihai, the latter of which is in Aksai Chin. China National Highway 580 is under construction connecting Kangxiwar directly with Hotan. It is scheduled to be completed in 2022.

Kangxiwar Daban or Koshbel Pass (lit. '"twin pass"') is a mountain pass located at the elevation of 4,250 metres (13,940 ft) downstream to the west.

== History ==
Before modern era, the area was a thoroughfare of the caravan trade route between Leh and Tarim Basin. The Hindutash Pass, a historical mountain pass through the Kunlun Mountains is just north of here. This place was previously referred to as Sumgal. Literally meaning "three fords" in Tibetic languages, it was a historical ford along with caravan camp. The caravan camp which had a shed was located slightly downstream to the west on the north bank of the Karakash River Another camp Ak-Koom was located slightly upstream to the east at the joining of two valleys.

During the 1860s at the time of Dungan Revolt, lawlessness led to the valley being frequented by Kyrgyz robbers who would capture caravans and sell the caravaners into slavery in Badakshan. A fort was set up by the princely state of Jammu and Kashmir (part of the British Indian Empire) downstream near Xaidulla to help protect the caravans.

By the 1930s, it was recorded by European travelers that a settlement of Kyrgyz nomads was located at Kangxiwar.

=== Sino-Indian war ===
During the 1962 Sino-Indian War, the PLA's Xinjiang Military Command set up the forward headquarters for its operations in the western sector (Aksai Chin) at Kangxiwar. It was commanded by the Deputy Commander-in-Chief of the Xinjiang Military Command. The 2nd Infantry Regiment of Xinjiang was stationed here and controlled the bases at Tianwendian, Heweitan, Kongka Pass and in Ngari. Certain activities were supervised directly by PLA General Staff Department. The Chinese soldiers who perished during the Indo-China war were buried at a military cemetery in Kangxiwar along the G219 highway. The cemetery contains the graves of over 100 PLA soldiers.

== See also ==
- Aksai Chin
- Dahongliutan
- Karakash River
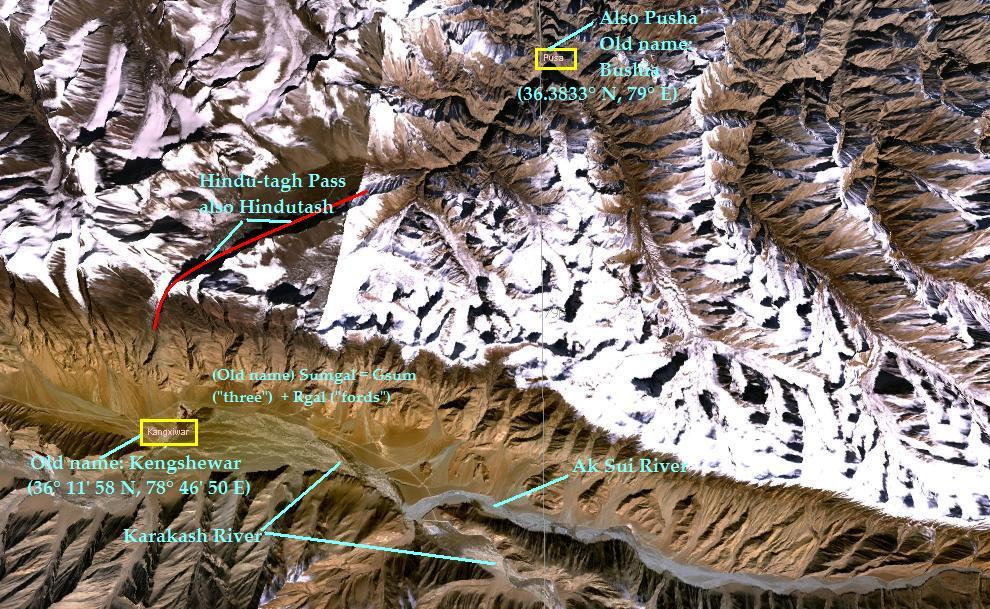
NASA satellite image showing the towns of Sumgal in Ladakh and Pusa in southwestern Hotan, and the Hindu-tash Pass connecting them. The pass is marked in bright red.

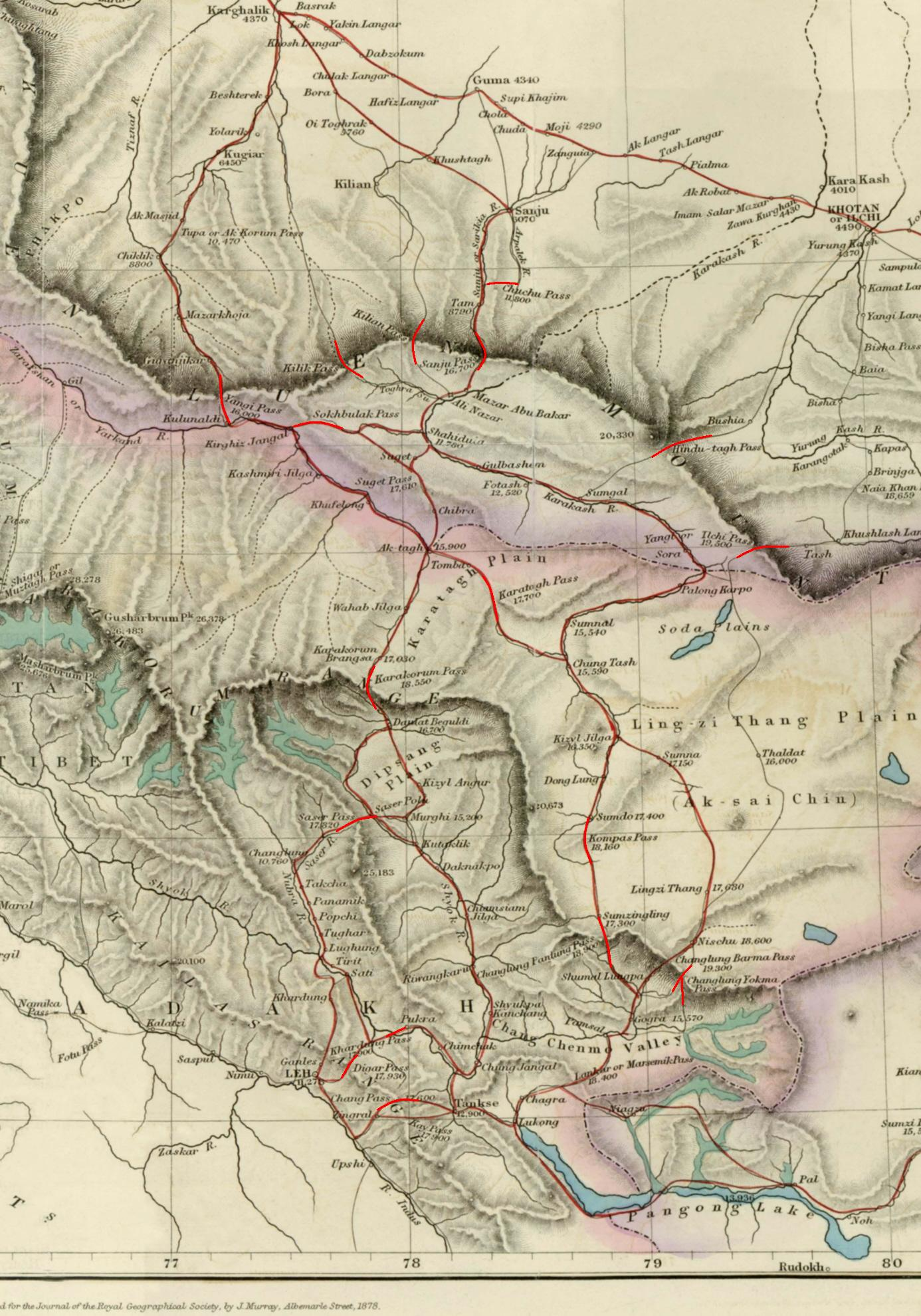
Sketch map of trade routes between Ladakh and Central Asia showing Sumgal (Trotter, 1873)

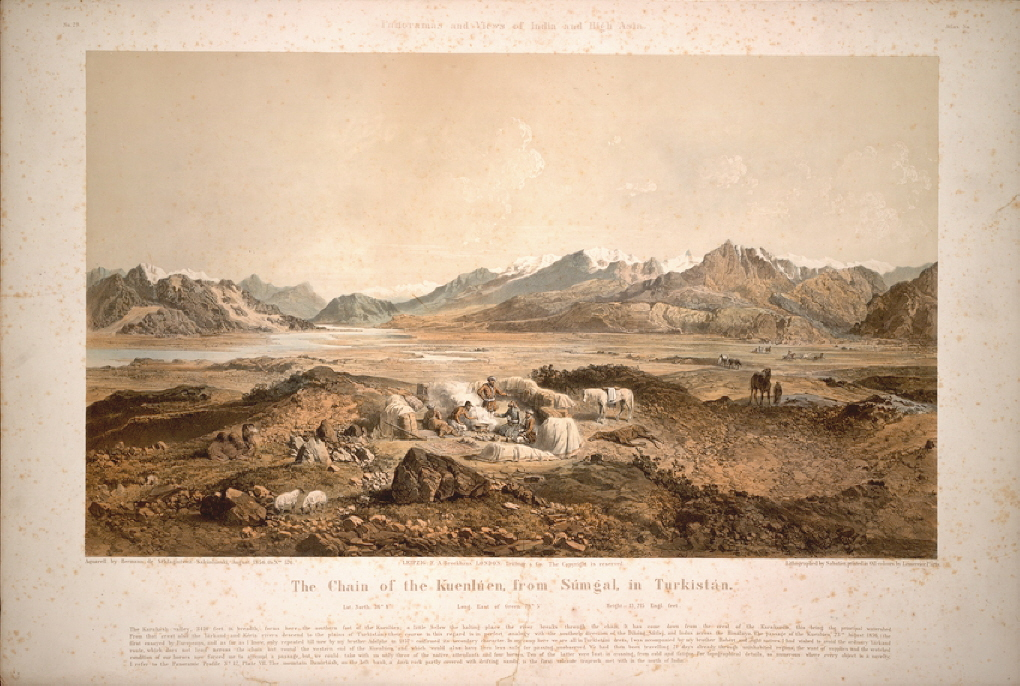
"The Chain of the Kuenlúen, from Súmgal, in Turkistán" by Hermann Schlagintweit

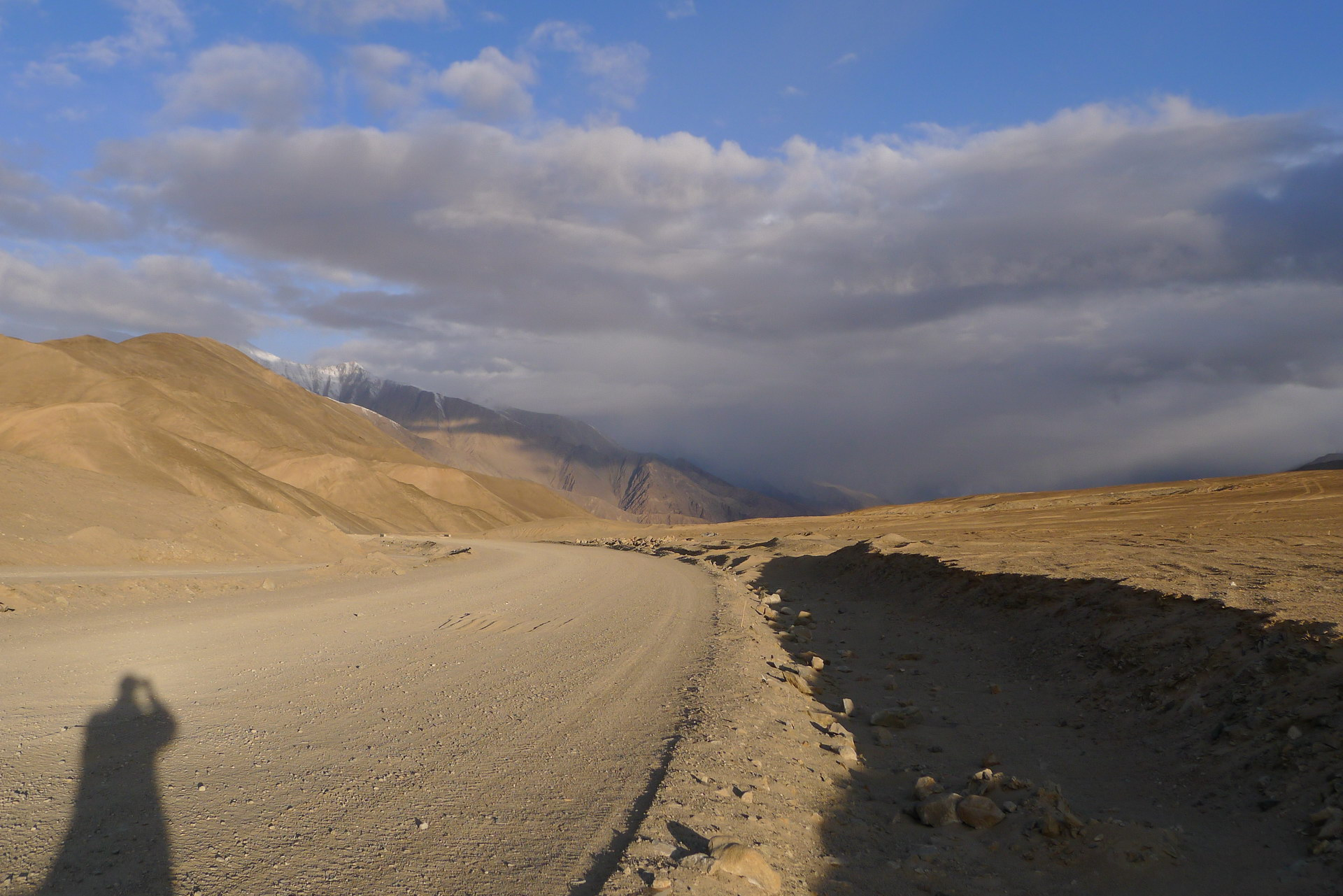
G216 near Kangxiwar Daban in 2012 before it was paved

== Bibliography ==
- Sandhu, P. J. S.; Shankar, Vinay; Dwivedi, G. G. (2015), 1962: A View from the Other Side of the Hill, Vij Books India Pvt Ltd, ISBN 978-93-84464-37-0
