= Tianshuihai =

Saltwater lake in Aksai Chin

- Tien Shui Hai
- 甜水海 (Chinese)
- Location within Southern Xinjiang Location within Ladakh
- Interactive map of Tianshuihai
- Coordinates: 35°20′40″N 79°30′30″E

Tianshuihai (Chinese: 甜水海; pinyin: Tiánshuǐ Hǎi; lit. 'sweet water sea'), alternatively spelled Tien Shui Hai, is a salt water lake in the disputed Aksai Chin region administered by China as part of the Xinjiang Autonomous Region (He'an County, Hotan Prefecture), which is also claimed by India. The lake's basin is a small plain, formerly known as the Thaldat basin or Mapothang. The lake drains the Thaldat stream that flows from the southwest. It is located east of the Lokzhung Range and northwest of the Aksai Chin Lake.

The Xinjiang–Tibet Highway of the 1950s was laid close to the lake, and an army service station was built on its banks, called the Tianshuihai service station. Around 2000, an improved national highway (G219) was laid on a new alignment further to the east, and the Tianshuihai service station was moved to a new location, closer to the new alignment.

== Toponymy ==
Tianshuihai
- Traditional Chinese: 甜水海
- Simplified Chinese: 甜水海
- Literal meaning: sweet water sea
Transcriptions
Standard Mandarin
- Hanyu Pinyin: Tiánshuǐhǎi
- Wade–Giles: Tʻien2-shui3-hai3

The name Tianshuihai means "sweet water sea" in Chinese, supposedly originating in local army folklore about a dying soldier whose last words before passing were that he wanted to taste sweetened water.

== Geography ==
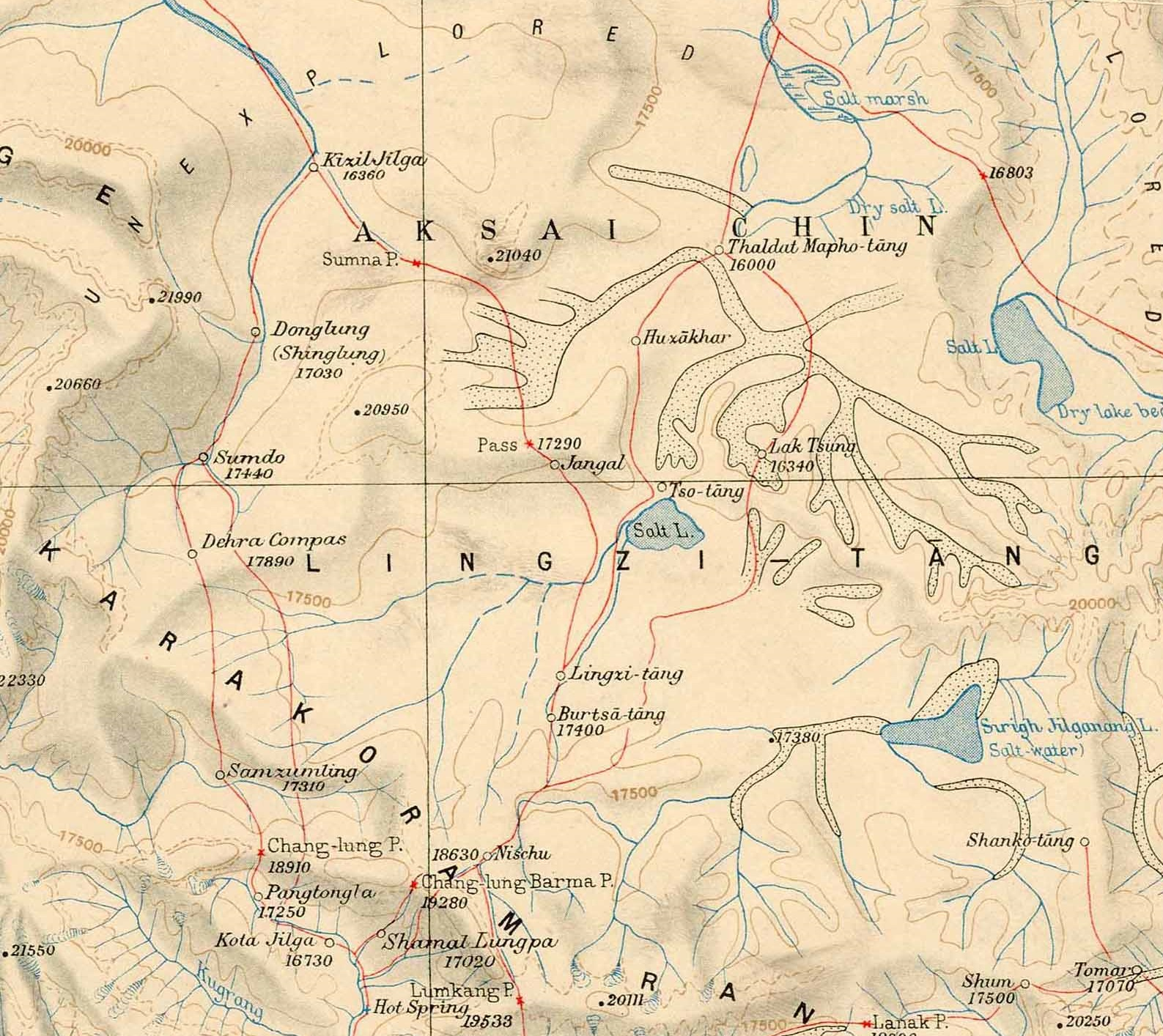
Thaldat Mapothang and Aksai Chin basins shown towards the top right, along with the route from Hot Springs (Survey of India, 1916)

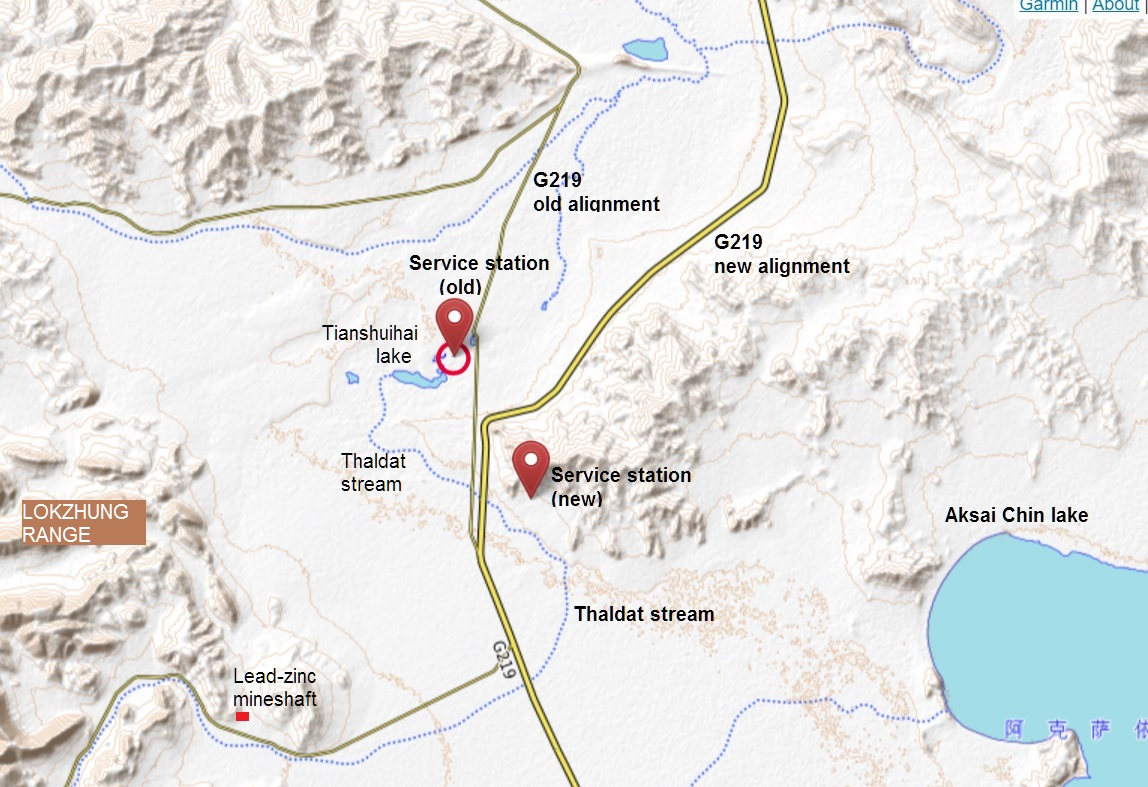
Tianshuihai lake basin

The Tianshuihai basin (or Thaldat basin) is at the northeastern corner of the Lokzhung Range of hills, which divide the Aksai Chin region into two distinct halves (called Lingzithang Plains and Kuenlun Plains by geologist Frederic Drew). The lake is said to drain a very large area, via the Thaldat stream that flows through the Lokzhung Range in a northeasterly direction.

The Thaldat area forms a small plain, which is covered with soft salt and disconnected watered pools from the Thaldat stream and its substreams (which have been referred to as "Thaldat lakes"). The ground is described as sterile. However, on the western edge of the plain, at the foot of Lokzhung hills, patches of vegetation were reported by Henry Cayley, who explored the area as the British Joint Commissioner in Ladakh. The local guides referred to these patches as "Thaldat". Cayley also reported that fuel was "plentiful".

Drew reported kyang (Tibetan wild ass) frequenting the basin, which was seen to be their watering place. Drew reported a two-mile-long track made by them.

The Tianshuihai lake has a depth of 56.32 metres (184.8 ft). All the lakes in the region are saltwater lakes. Geologically, the area is part of a terrane that was formed in early Mesozoic.

== History ==
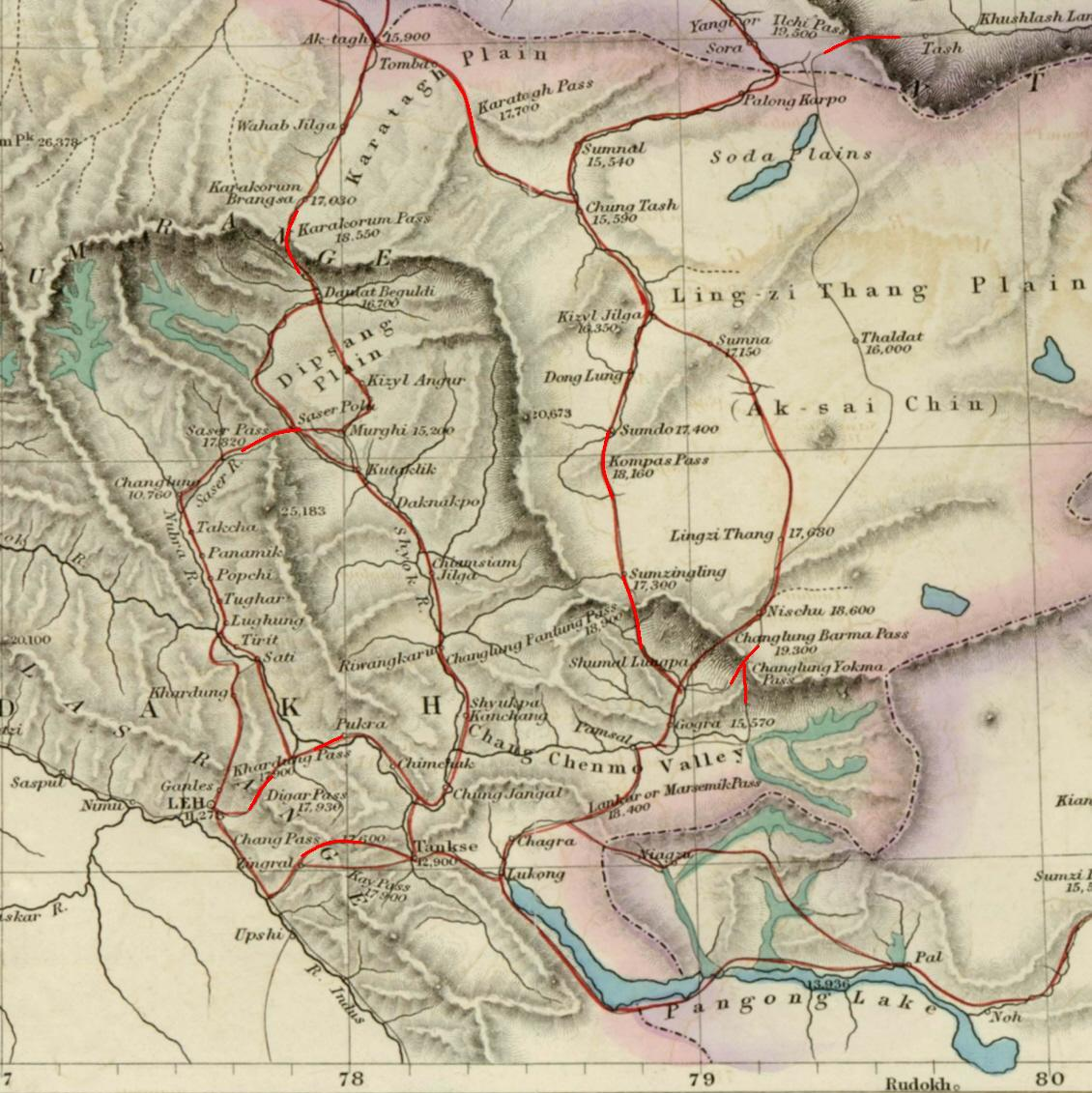
Routes explored during the Forsyth Mission to Yarkand (Trotter 1873)

In 1857, Adolphe Schlagintweit, crossed the Aksai Chin plateau via the Thaldat basin. He was led through the route by a Yarkandi guide called Mahomed Ameen. Schagintweit was executed in Kashgar and did not get an opportunity to describe his explorations. Ameen is said to have given an imprecise description of the route to the British.

In 1865, the surveyor W. H. Johnson surveyed the Aksai Chin region and took the same route as Schlagintweit had done earlier. He too crossed the Askai Chin plains, and went up to Khotan at the invitation of its then ruler.

In 1867, the British stationed Henry Cayley as a Joint Commissioner in Ladakh for supporting British Indian trade through Ladakh. Cayley explored routes through the Aksai Chin plateau, including Thaldat. He noted that his Ladakhi porters seemed to know the place well and also that they found the name "Mapothang" objectionable in the Tibetan language.

In 1870, a trade mission was sent to Yarkand under the leadership of T. D. Forsyth, during which all the routes through Aksai Chin were explored. It appears that two routes to the west of Thaldat (through Samzungling and Lingzithang) were found preferable, Thaldat fell out of interest after this.

== Service station ==
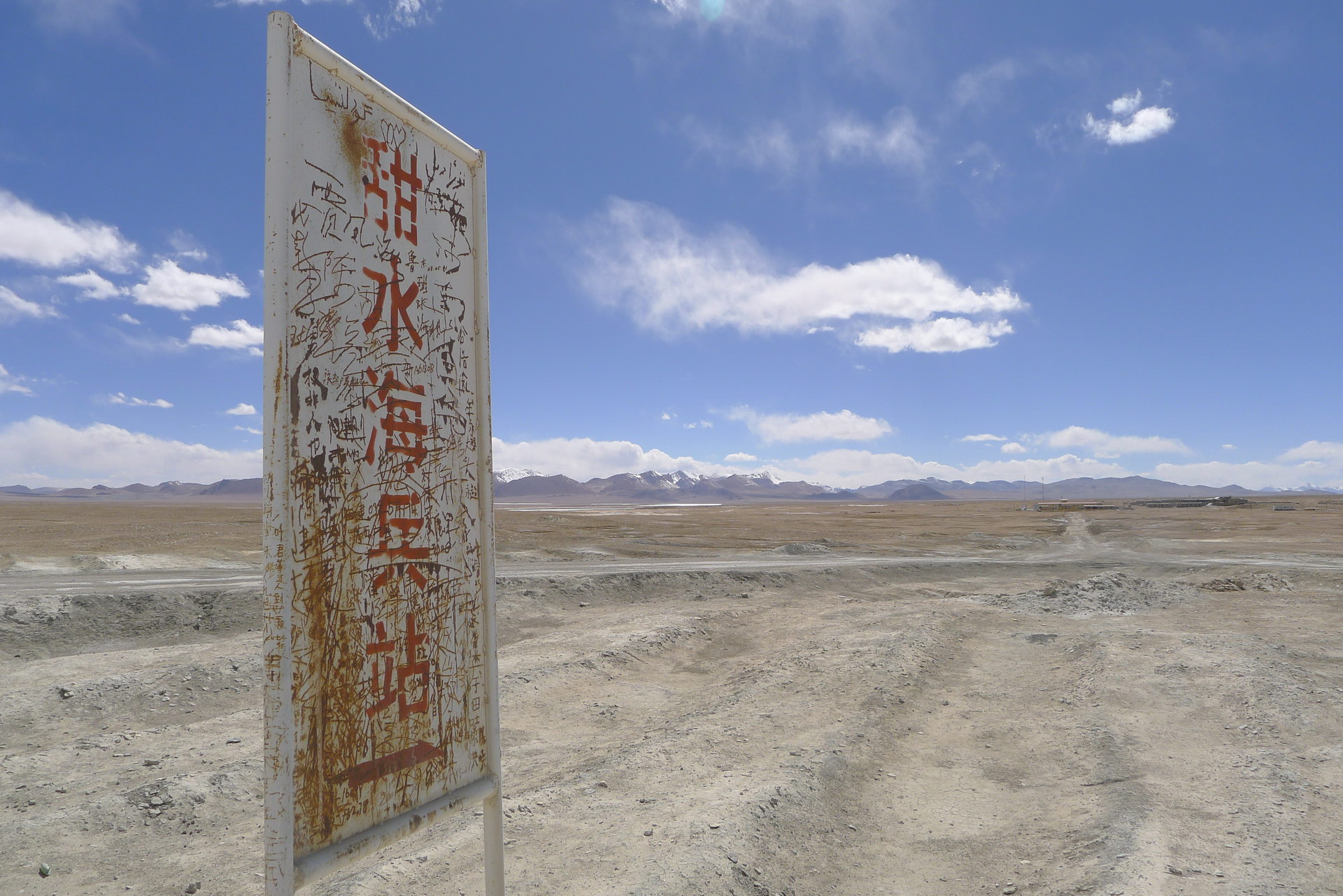
The Tianshuihai service station sign

The service station is located at an elevation of 4,850 metres (15,910 ft). Due to this high elevation, there are few inhabitants in the remote area. Since the 1990s, there were numerous attempts by outsiders to establish restaurants or businesses in the area, but so far most have failed. While legally not permitted to accommodate outsiders, given the harsh environment, when not accommodating army personnel, the army service station would offer food and lodging to civilians for a relatively expensive price.

== Transportation ==
China National Highway 219, known as the Xinjiang–Tibet highway, passes nearby, connecting it with Lhasa and Yecheng County. The outpost is 575 kilometres (357 mi) from the starting point of National Highway 219 in Yecheng County. The next settlement northward along the highway is Dahongliutan. The next settlement southward along the highway is the rest stop at Quanshui Lake in Tibet.

The service station was constructed in 1959. During the Sino-Indian War in 1962, Tianshuihai region served as the main communication artery for 3 fronts of the Chinese offensive.

== See also ==
- List of locations in Aksai Chin § Outposts

== Bibliography ==
- Cayley, H. (1868), "Report on the Route to the Karakash River via the Changchenmo Valley and Pass", Selections from the Records of the Government of the Punjab and its Dependencies, New Series, No. II, Government of Punjab – via archive.org
- Drew, Frederic (1875), The Jummoo and Kashmir Territories: A Geographical Account, E. Stanford – via archive.org
- Norin, Erik (1946), Geological Explorations in Western Tibet, Stockholm: Tryceeri Aktierolaget Thule – via archive.org
