= Dahongliutan =

Dahongliutan 大红柳滩 Ta-hung-liu-t'an
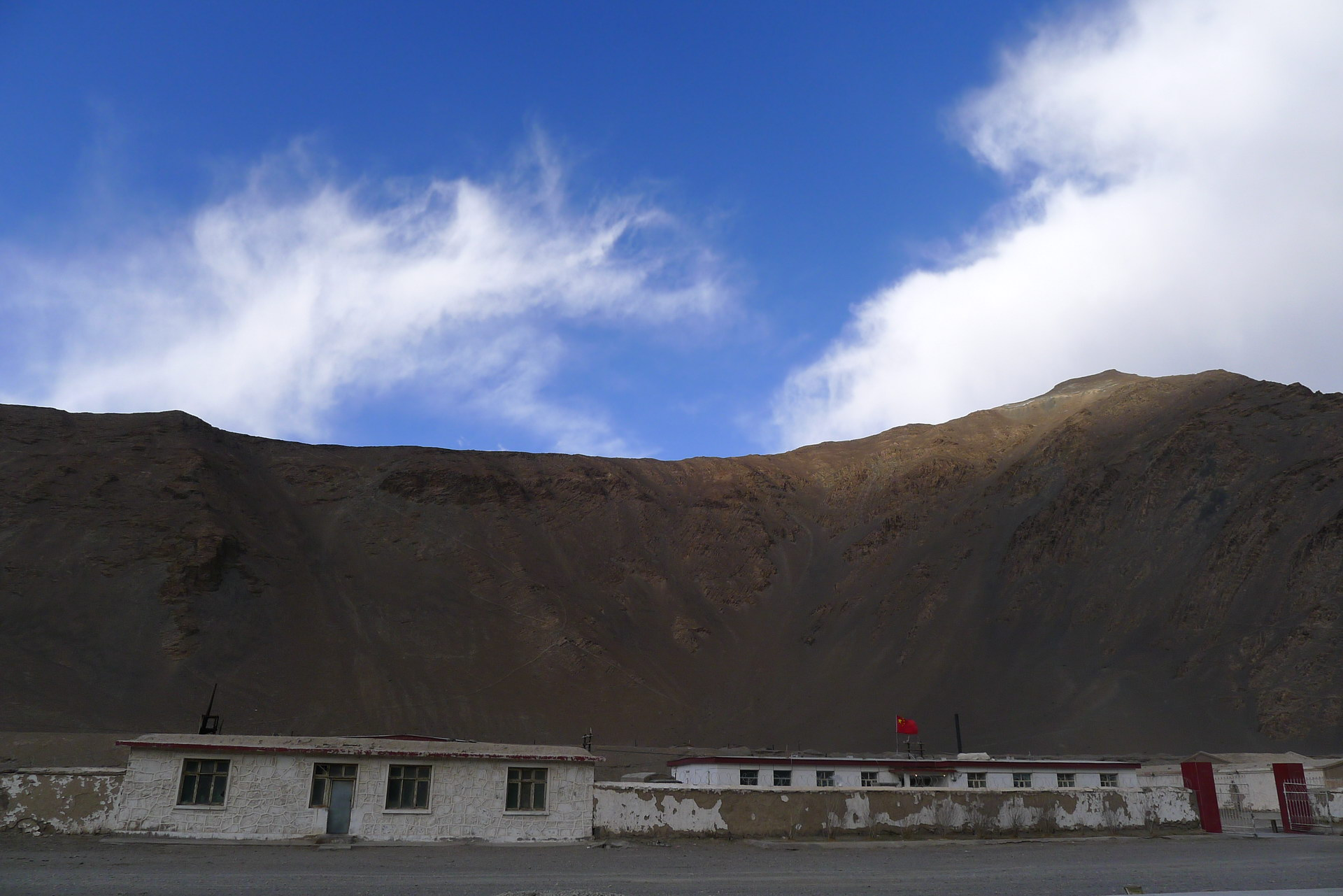
- Dahongliutan army service station

- Location within Southern Xinjiang
- Coordinates: 35.98°N 79.19°E
- Country: China
- Region: Xinjiang
- Prefecture: Hotan Prefecture
- County: Hotan County
- Elevation: 4,200 m (13,800 ft)
- Time zone: +8

Dahongliutan
- Traditional Chinese: 大紅柳灘
- Simplified Chinese: 大红柳滩
- Literal meaning: big red willow beach
Transcriptions
Standard Mandarin
- Hanyu Pinyin: Dàhóngliǔtān
- Wade–Giles: Ta⁴-hung²-liu³-tʻan¹

Alternative Chinese name
- Traditional Chinese: 紅柳灘
- Simplified Chinese: 红柳滩
- Literal meaning: red willow beach
Transcriptions
Standard Mandarin
- Hanyu Pinyin: Hóngliǔtān

Dahongliutan (Chinese: 大红柳滩) or simply Hongliutan (Chinese: 红柳滩) is a village situated in Karakash river valley in the Hotan County, Hotan Prefecture, Xinjiang, China. It is located along the China National Highway 219, and is the town just north of the disputed Aksai Chin region of China and India.

Dahongliutan lies along the China National Highway G219. Following the highway westward, the deserted town of Kangxiwar is about 50 km west and the modern town of Xaidulla is about 115 km west. Following the highway southeastward leads to Aksai Chin. The Tianshuihai army service station in Aksai Chin is about 100 km south along the highway.

== History ==
Being about a few miles downstream of the bend of Karakash River, the area was noted by the British archaeologist Aurel Stein as the highest point on the Karakash Valley at which there was adequate grazing for pack animals. As such, it was used as a camp by number of European expeditions in the late 1800s and early 1900s. Dahongliutan was roughly where the Mandalik camp was during British explorer George W. Hayward's expedition in the 1860s, and short distance downstream of site of Sora camp during British diplomat Thomas Douglas Forsyth's expedition in the 1870s. It was known as Abdul Ghafur Tam during Aurel Stein's visit in the first decade of 1900s and as Abdul Ghafur Langar during German explorer Emil Trinkler's visit in the late 1920s.

In late 2018, the China Geological Survey announced the discovery of pegmatitic lithium deposits in Dahongliutan during a field visit. The commercial exploration rights were auctioned off in late 2019 for CN¥ 2.8 billion.

== Historical maps ==
Historical English-language maps including Dahongliutan, late 20th century:

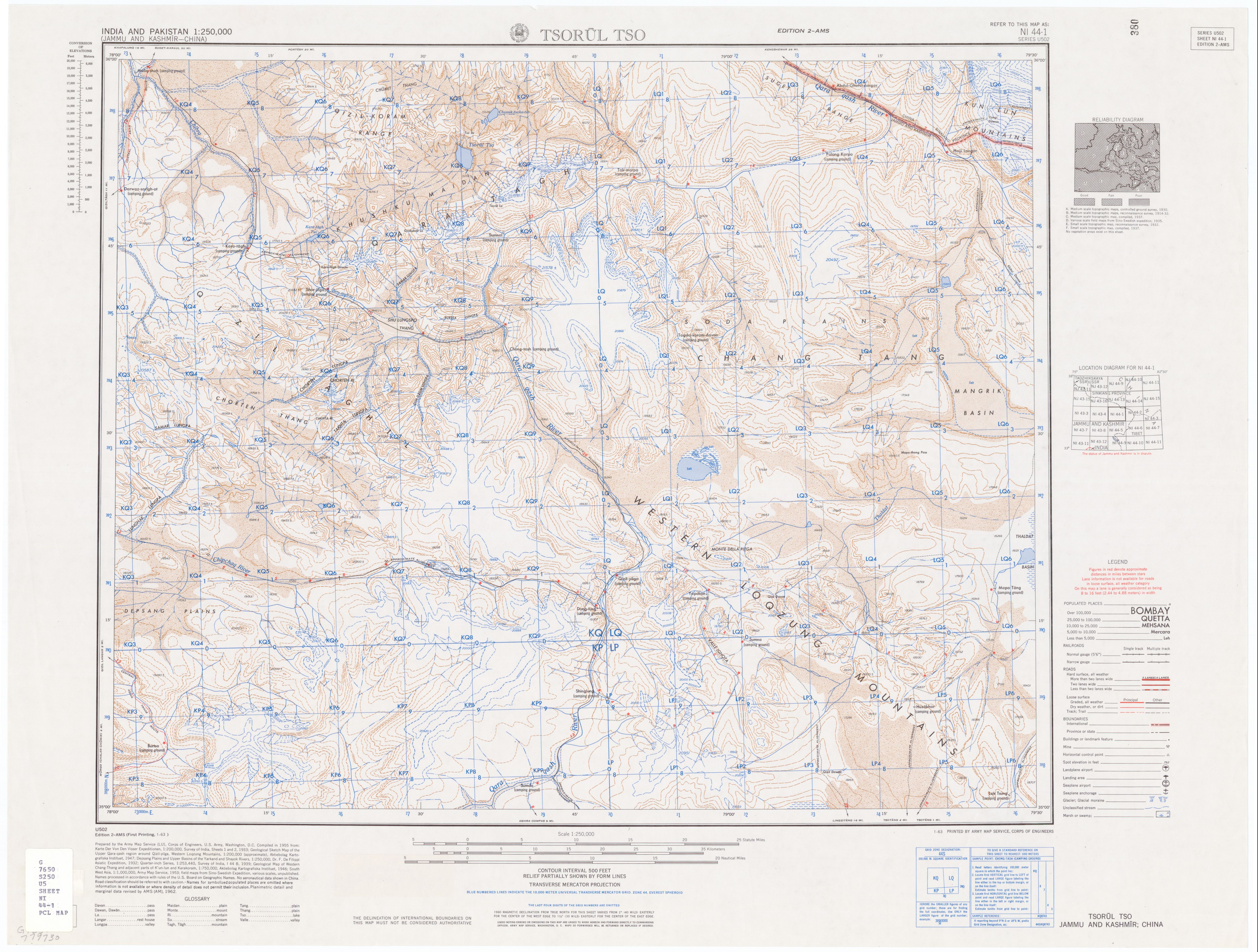
Map including Abdul Ghafur Langar (AMS, 1955)

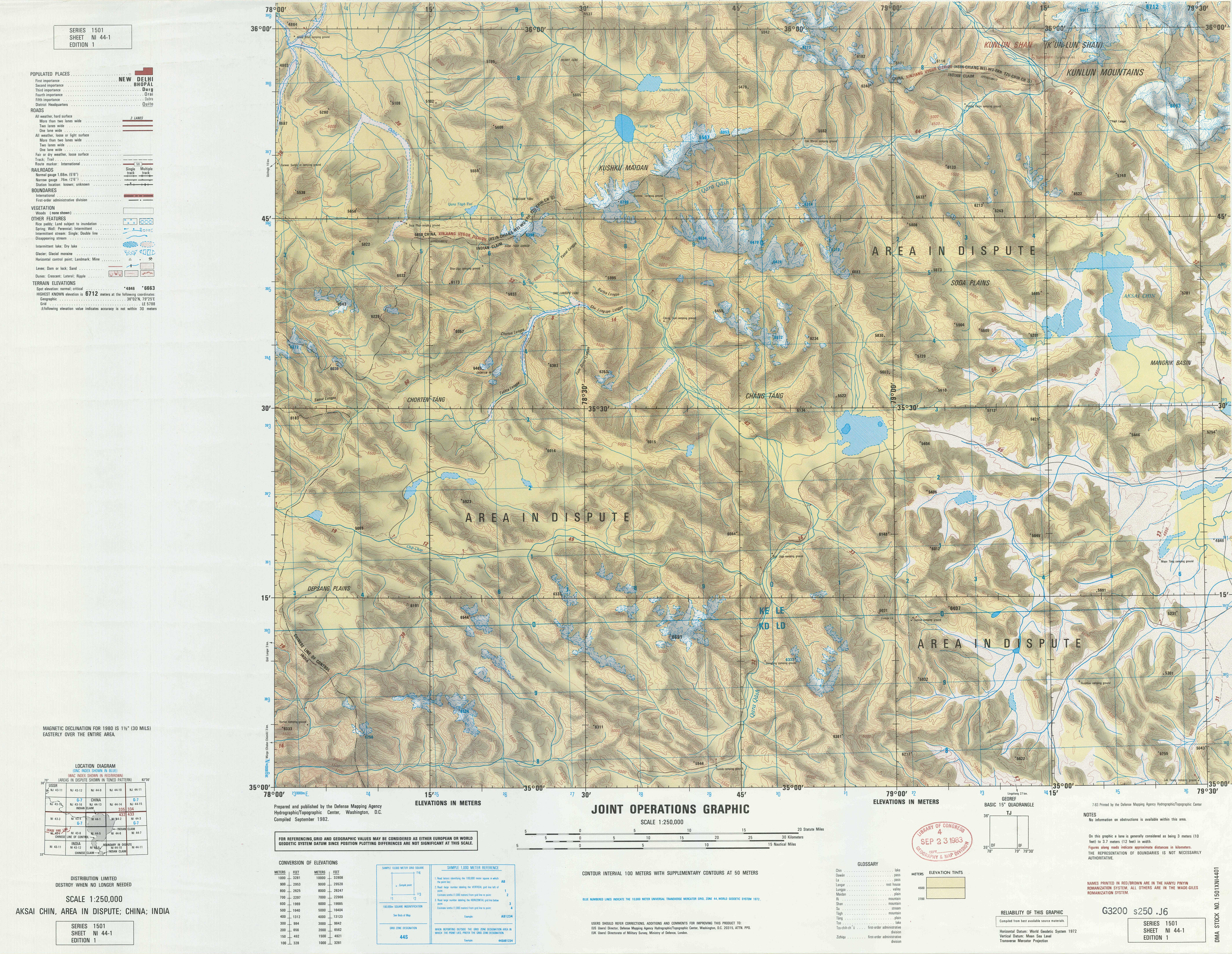
Map including Dahongliutan (Ta-hung-liu-t'an) (DMA, 1982)

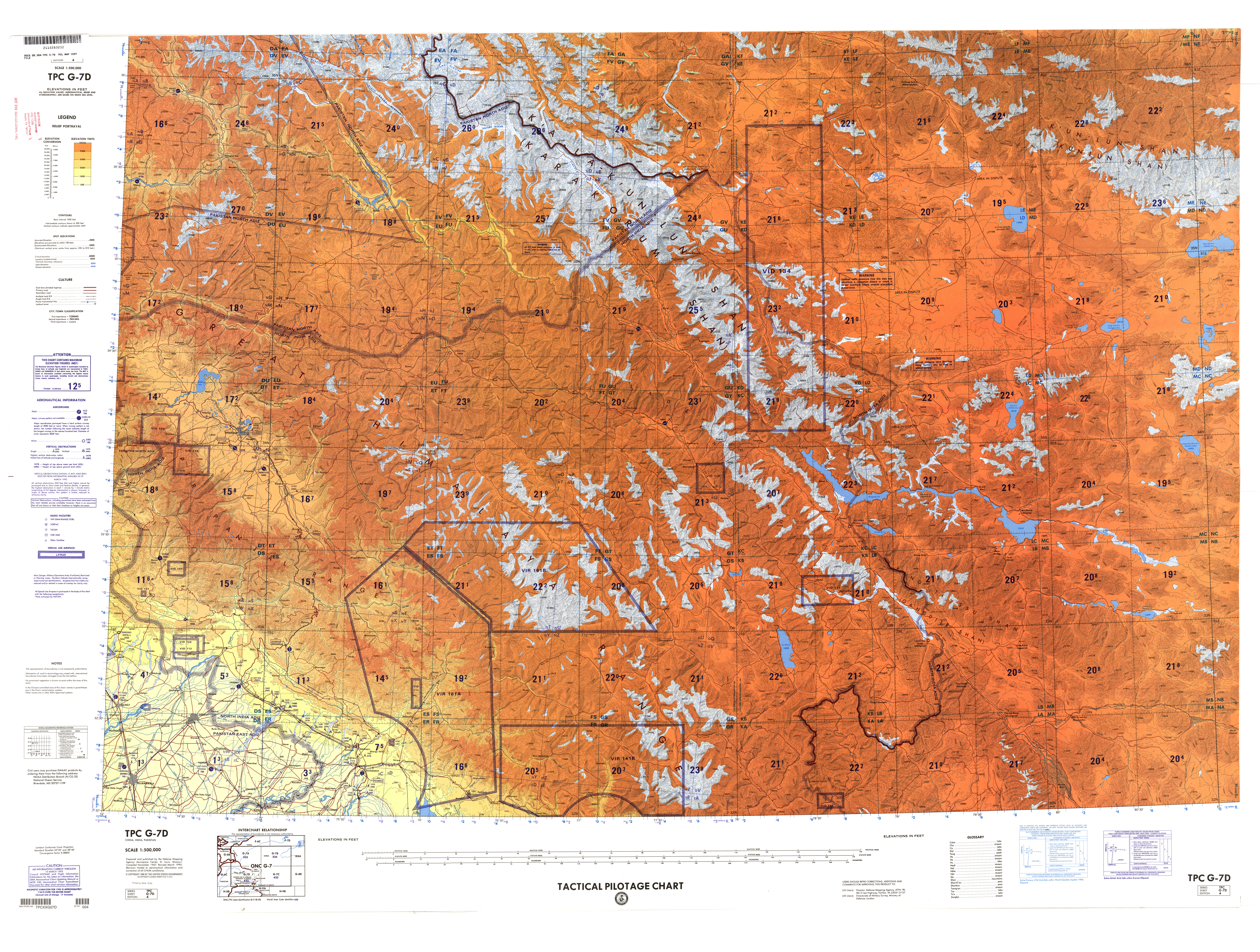
Map of the region including Dahongliutan (labeled as Ta-hung-li-t'an (Dahangliutan [sic])) (DMA, 1995) (Note: From map: "The representation of boundaries is not necessarily authoritative.")

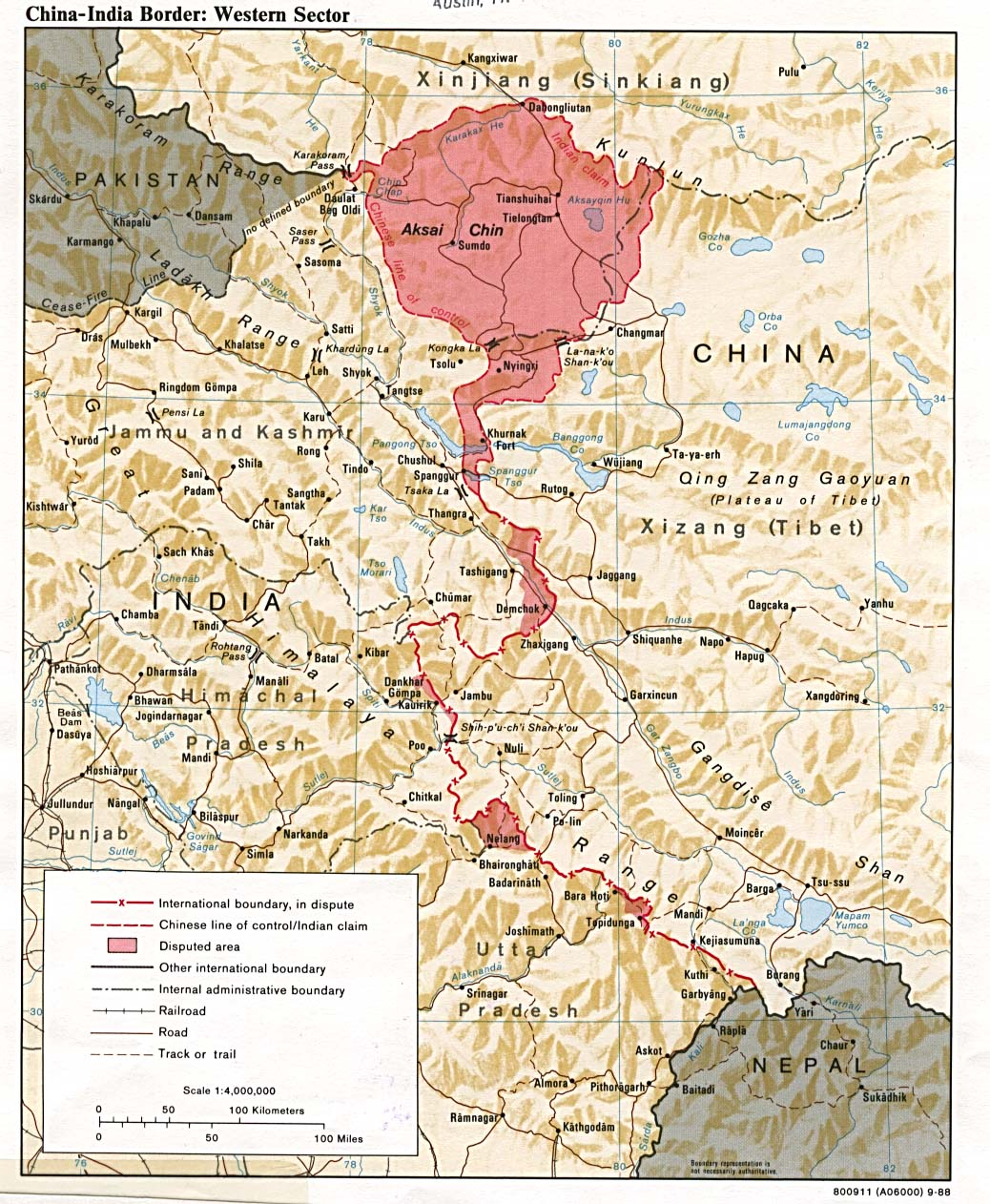
1988 CIA map of Aksai Chin including Dahongliutan (Note: From map: "Boundary representation is not necessarily authoritative.")
