= Pishan =

Pishan may refer to:

- Pishan County, in Hotan Prefecture, Xinjiang, China
- Pishan Town, in Pishan County, Hotan Prefecture, Xinjiang, China
- Pishan Island, an island in Chekiang Province, Republic of China
