= Jiangnan Metropolitan News =

Chinese newspaper

Jiangnan Metropolitan Daily
- Native name: 江南都市报
- Publisher: Jiangnan Metropolitan News Agency
- Founded: April 1, 1994
- Language: Chinese
- Headquarters: Nanchang, Jiangxi
- OCLC number: 868912511
- Website: jnds.com.cn

Jiangnan Metropolitan News or Jiangnan Dushibao (Chinese: 江南都市报), also known as Jiangnan Metropolitan Daily or Jiangnan Capital Post or Jiangnan City Daily or Jiangnan Metropolis Daily, is a simplified Chinese newspaper published in China. The newspaper is a comprehensive urban life newspaper sponsored by the Jiangxi Daily Agency (江西日报社).

Inaugurated on April 1, 1994, the predecessor of the paper was Ganjiang Folk News (赣江大众报), which was renamed Jiangnan Metropolitan News on August 1, 1997.

== Violated the Chinese government's censorship order ==
On February 14, 2017, a knife attack occurred in Pishan County, Xinjiang. Only the Jiangnan Metropolitan News violated the Chinese government's censorship order and opened the news post function on this accident, allowing the outside to see the views of Chinese netizens on the attack. In response to this behavior, a researcher of China Department of Human Rights Watch argued that Chinese netizens attacked minority Uyghur Muslims without knowing the truth, and noted that China's internet censorship undermined its own goal.
