= Muji (disambiguation) =

Muji is a Japanese retail company.

Muji may also refer to:

== Places ==
- Muji, Xinjiang (مۇجى بازىرى), a town in Guma (Pishan) County, Hotan Prefecture, Xinjiang, China
- Muji Township, a township in Akto, Kizilsu, Xinjiang, China
