= Pishan hostage crisis =

Hostage crisis in Pishan, Xinjiang

Coordinates: 37.6167°N 78.3000°E

- Pishan is located in the southwest corner of Hotan Prefecture (pictured), Xinjiang.
- Native name: 皮山县挟持人质事件
- Location: Koxtag (Kuoshi Tage), Pishan/Guma County, Hotan Prefecture, Xinjiang Uygur Autonomous Region, China
- Date: 28 December 2011; 14 years ago
- Target: Goat shepherds, police
- Attack type: Hostage crisis
- Deaths: 7 hostage-takers, 1 policeman
- Injuries: 4 hostage-takers, 1 policeman
- Perpetrator: Xinjiang separatists

The Pishan hostage crisis occurred on the night of 28 December 2011, in Koxtag (Kuoshi Tage), Pishan/Guma County, Hotan Prefecture, Xinjiang Uygur Autonomous Region, China. A group of 15 ethnic Uyghur kidnapped two goat shepherds for directions near the Indian and Pakistan borders. They were soon confronted by a group of five Pishan policemen, who tried to negotiate for the shepherds' release. This led to a shootout in which a police officer and 7 hostage-takers were killed. Another police officer was injured, and 4 suspects were taken into custody. Both of the hostages were rescued by police.

== Background ==
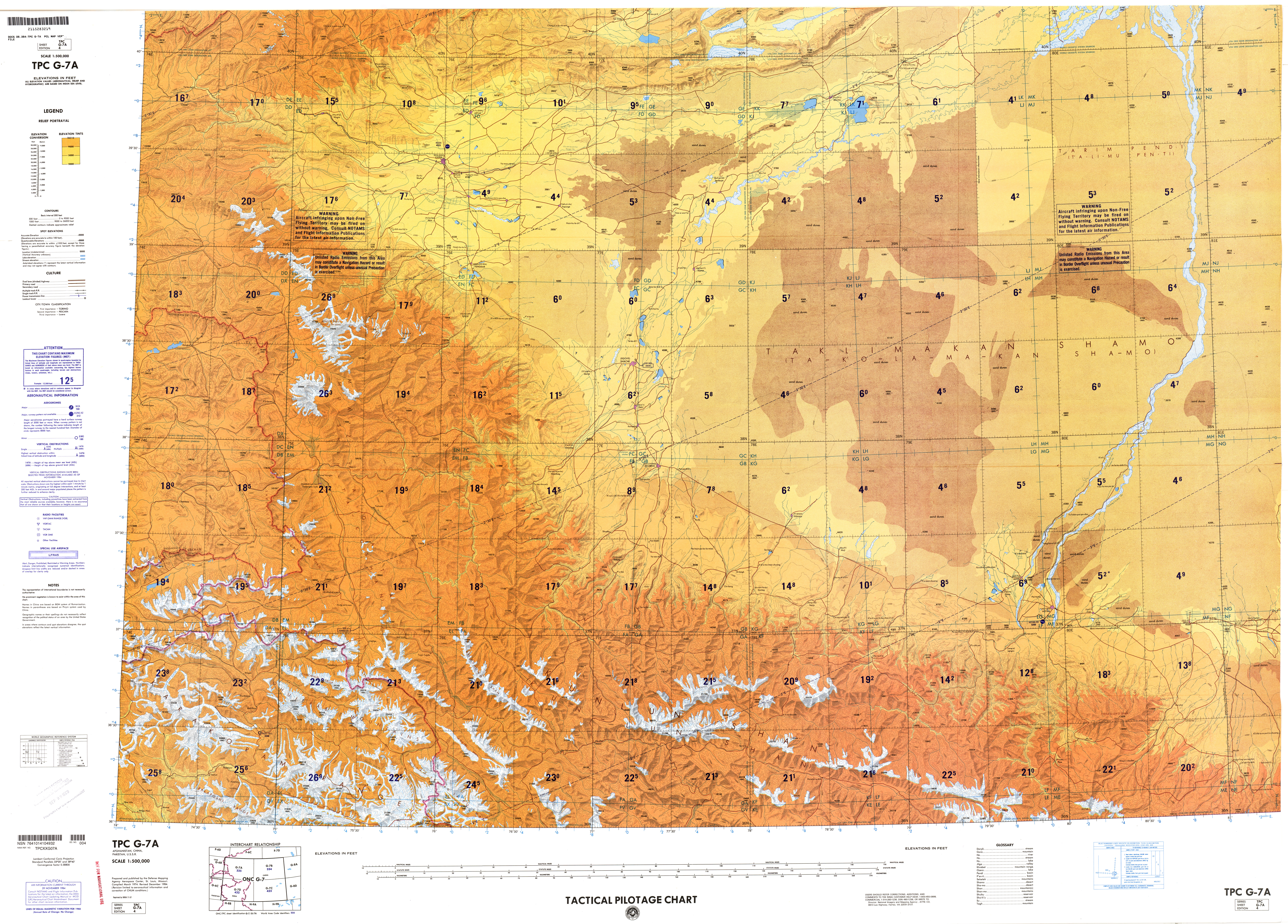
Map including Koxtag (Ko-shih-t'a-ko [sic]) (DMA, 1984)

Pishan County is one of the poorest counties in the Xinjiang region, on the southern edge of the Taklamakan Desert bordering Pakistan's Azad Kashmir. An oasis county, its people are predominantly cotton-growers. Han Chinese account for less than 2% of the population of Pishan. Residents of Pishan told Xinhua that a new spirit of extremism was damaging organized Uyghur life. Earlier in the month, religious extremists kidnapped and murdered a Uyghur man for drinking alcohol, which is prohibited in Islam. Store-owners in Pishan who sell alcoholic drinks and cigarettes said that they feared retaliation by extremists.

The ethnic Uyghur-dominated southern part of Xinjiang has witnessed increasing separatist violence by ethnic Uyghur militants who want to establish an independent state. On April 18 and 21, there were two fatal incidents of Uyghurs stabbing Han Chinese in the city of Kashgar. In July, a group of militants seized a police station, took hostages, and battled police in a standoff that would ultimately end in 18 deaths. In that same month, a group of militants trained in Pakistan killed 14 people in attacks in Kashgar.

== Events ==
2011 Pishan hostage crisis
- Simplified Chinese: 新疆皮山县挟持人质事件
- Traditional Chinese: 新疆皮山縣挾持人質事件
- Literal meaning: Xinjiang Pishan County hostage-taking incident
Transcriptions
Standard Mandarin
- Hanyu Pinyin: Xīnjiāng Píshān Xiàn xiéchí rénzhì shìjiàn

According to Global Times, the group of terror suspects had been trying to cross into Central Asia to receive jihadist training when they lost their way near Pishan. On 28 December, at around 11 pm (1500 GMT) they kidnapped two Uyghur goat shepherds in the town of Kuoshi Tage (Qoshtagh) and forced the shepherds to act as their guides. The kidnapping was witnessed by several workers at the Kuoshi Tage agricultural cooperative.

At the border village of Mokoyla, the shepherds alerted local police to the group's intentions. Five police officers, led by Pishan County deputy police chief Adil Abduweli (阿迪力·阿布杜外力), tried to persuade the party to abandon their plans, while negotiating for the shepherds' release. The party instead argued with the police, and when Abduweli touched one of the men's wives, the kidnappers shot at them. Abdulweli was fatally stabbed and another police officer was injured. According to local residents, the remaining police officers returned fire, killing seven kidnappers and detaining four, who are charged with resisting arrest. The two hostages were freed, unharmed.

An initial report by Xinhua News Agency did not announce the ethnicity of the kidnappers, except to say that they were ethnic minorities. A government official told BBC News that both the kidnappers and hostages were Uyghur with Radio Free Asia (RFA) citing a source within Pishan County police also confirming the perpetrators' background. Memet Eziz Hapiz, village chief of the No. 8 village of the Mokoyla hamlets stated that the hostage-takers "were firm in their religious beliefs and liked to live according to their beliefs" and sought "religious freedom" abroad. Hapiz stated that one of the dead, Hebibulla Abduqadi, had taken an "illegal religious class" in Artush three months prior.

The Uyghur Online website named six of the hostage-takers, four men and two women, all of whom were from Mokoyla. The Seydexmets were siblings. Four others were injured.

- Abdumijit Seydexmet (阿卜杜米吉提·赛迪艾合买提), 25 or 26
- Buzohere Seydexmet (布佐赫拉·赛迪艾合买提), 27
- Abliz Seydexmet (阿不力孜·赛迪艾合买提), 30
- Hebibulla Abduqadir (艾比布拉·阿布杜卡迪尔), 26
- Burabiye Abduqadir (布热比娅·阿布杜卡迪尔), 29
- Ablikim Abduqadir 阿布力克木·阿布杜卡迪尔), 40

The seventh fatality was not identified. According to Radio Free Asia, citing village committee head Turahmet Mijit, speculation among Mokoyla villagers claimed that this fatality may have been the six-year-old son of Abdumijit Seydexmet, who was unaccounted for since the attack, though his death was never confirmed. Mijit noted that there were otherwise no signs of unrest in Mokoyla and discontent limited to the families of the deceased. Local party secretary Deng Jiaojun told chairwoman of Mokoyla Women's Union Buzeynep that a six-year-old, presumably referring to the Seydexmet boy, had taken part in the assault on police by throwing rocks.

Additionally, five minors, aged 7 to 17, were detained. According to police, one of the four injured was the 17-year-old boy, who was severely wounded by an accidental gunshot after being mistaken for an adult. After an inquiry by a school district official, the county jail stated that the children were to remain in custody until the completion of the investigation. The children or the bodies of the seven fatalities had not been returned as of 8 January 2012.

== Reactions ==
The biography of the murdered police officer Adil Abdulweli became a teaching subject of the county school system.

World Uyghur Congress spokesperson Dilxadi Rexiti (迪里夏提, also known as Dilxat Raxit) said on 29 December that the hostage-takers were "angry" that police had searched private homes for Islamic extremist material, explaining the police attack as a matter of "the local Uighur people [not being able to] take the pressure anymore." Rexiti also questioned the death toll, claiming that his "sources" reported deaths of nine or ten among the kidnappers, not seven. On the other hand, Xinjiang government spokeswoman Hou Hanmin said that the kidnappers were "violent terrorists". No more details on the kidnappers have been released as the police are investigating the incident.

On 31 December, CPC party chief of Xinjiang Zhang Chunxian pledged to "safeguard regional stability" and to enlist the Xinjiang public in the fight against "foreign religious infiltration" and "organized terrorist attacks".
