= Zangguy =

Zangguy زاڭگۇي يېزىسى 藏桂乡
- Township
- Location in Xinjiang Zangguy (China)
- Coordinates: 37°17′N 78°46′E
- Country: China
- Autonomous Region: Xinjiang
- Prefecture: Hotan
- County: Guma / Pishan County

Area
  - Total: 855 km^{2} (330 sq mi)

Population (2006)
  - Total: 13,027

Ethnic groups
  - Major ethnic groups: Uyghur

Zangguy (simplified Chinese: 藏桂乡; traditional Chinese: 藏桂鄉) is a township in Guma County in the Hotan Prefecture of Xinjiang, in northwestern China. According to the 2006 Chinese census, the township has a population of 13,027 people and covers 855 square kilometres.

== History ==
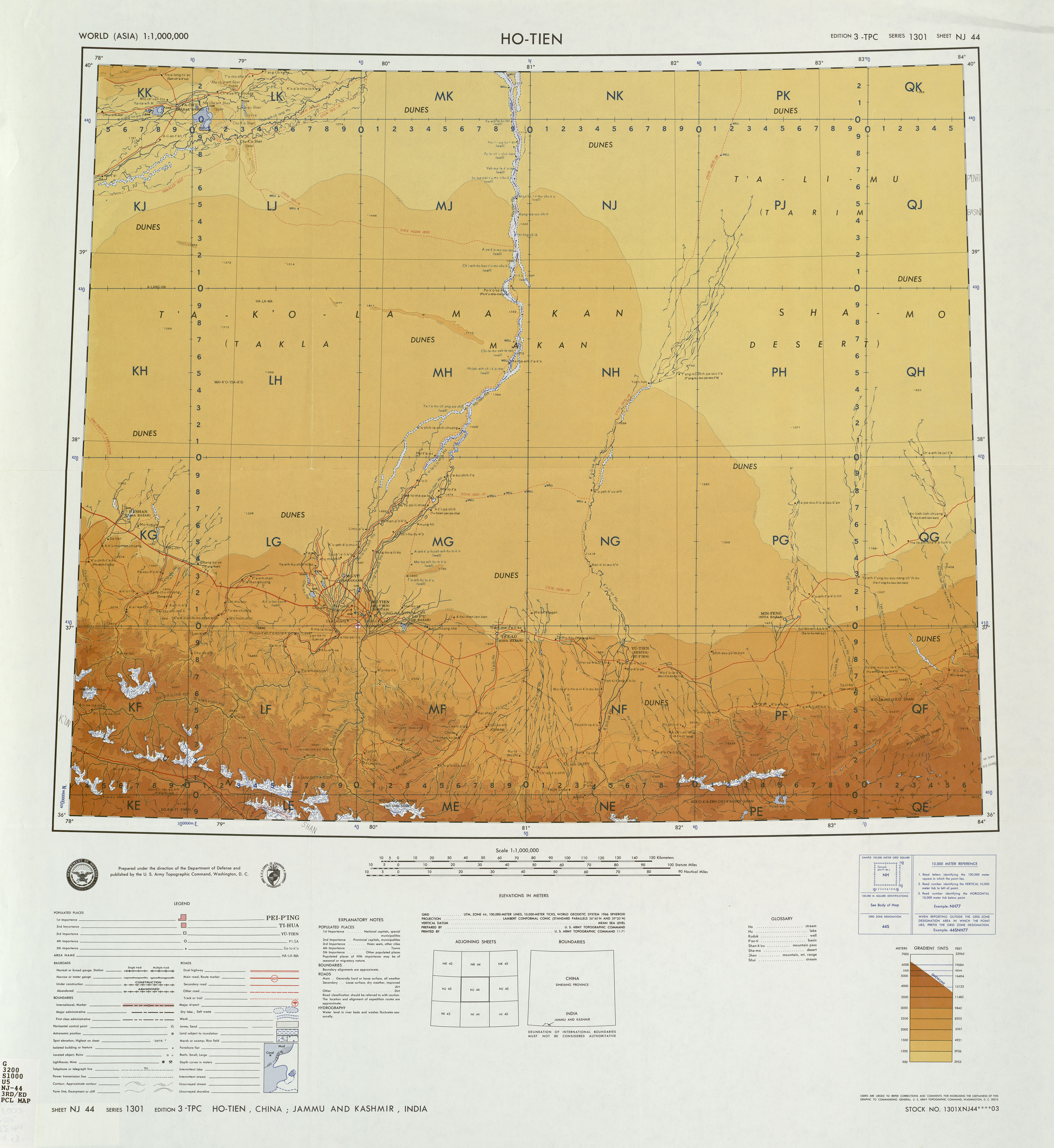
Map including Zangguy (labeled as Chang-ku-ya (Ts'ang-kuei)) and surrounding region (USATC, 1971) (Note: From map: "DELINEATION OF INTERNATIONAL BOUNDARIES MUST NOT BE CONSIDERED AUTHORITATIVE".)

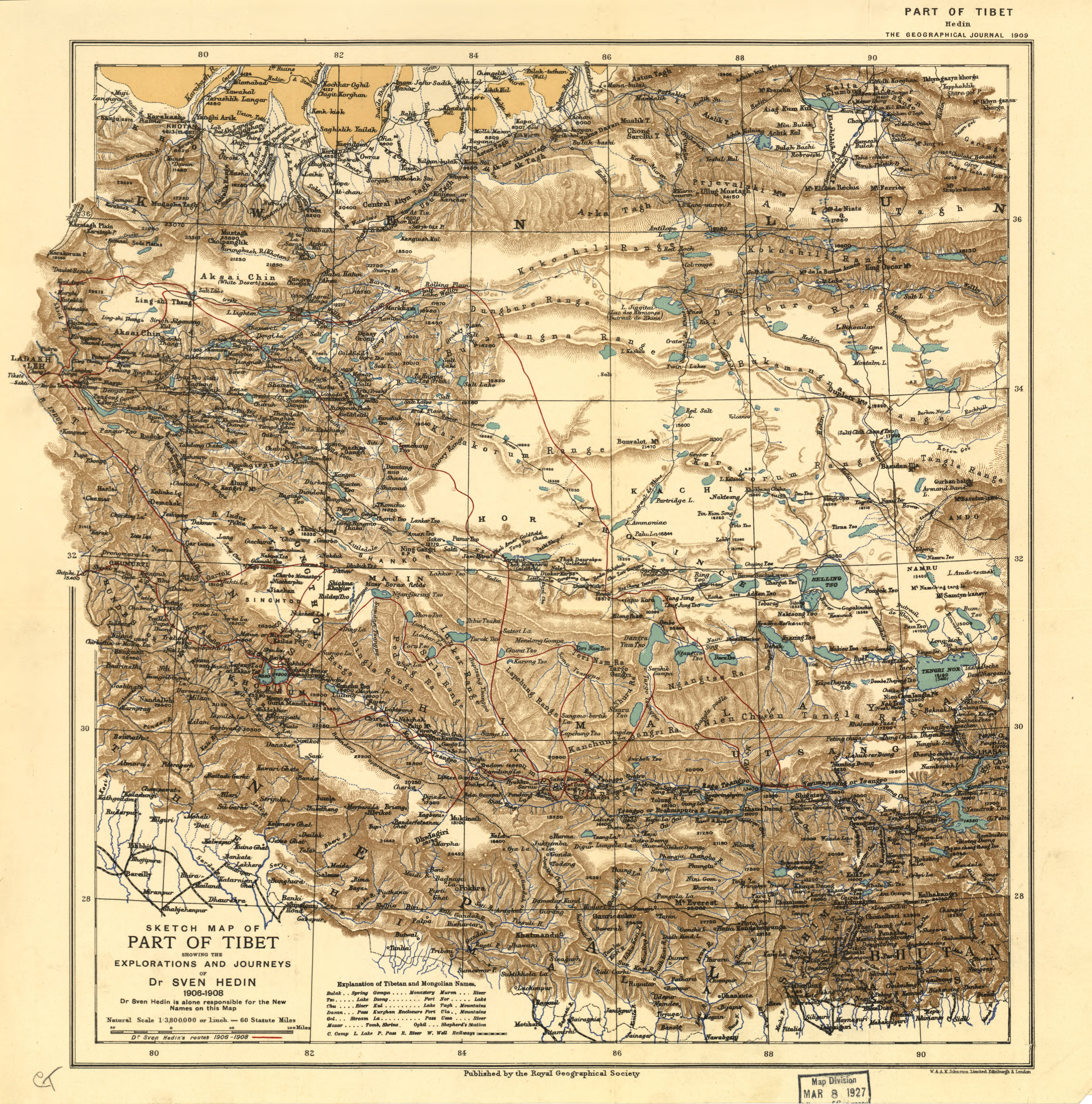
Map including Zangguy (labeled as Zangguya) (RGS, early 20th century)

In 1958, Xingfu Commune (幸福公社) was established.

In 1978, Xingfu Commune was renamed Zangguy Commune (藏桂公社).

In 1984, Zangguy Commune became Zangguy Township.

== Geography ==
It is surrounded by the Taklamakan Desert and has a flat, dry continental climate, with an average annual temperature of 11.6 °C. The average temperature in July, the hottest month is 24.9 °C, with the coldest average temperature of -6 °C in January.

== Administrative divisions ==
Zangguy Township has jurisdiction over 11 village committees.

Residential community (Mandarin Chinese Hanyu Pinyin-derived names):

- Jinhui (金徽社区)

Villages:

- Kule'airike (库勒艾日克村), Yaboyi (亚博依村), Yingqikai'airike (英其开艾日克村), Ya (亚村), Tatirang (塔提让村), Langan (兰干村), Yingwusitang (英吾斯塘村), Bulake (布拉克村), Kumuboyi (库木博依村), Aqikashi (阿其喀什村), Kulebixi (库勒比西村)

Other areas:

- Yamanya (亚曼亚农场)

== Economy ==
2.84 million mu of the township is under cultivation, mainly producing wheat, maize, cotton, oilseeds and pulses, fruits and vegetables, barley and alfalfa. Animal husbandry and rearing of sheep, cattle, horses, camels and donkeys is also practised.

== Transportation ==
- China National Highway 315

== See also ==
- List of township-level divisions of Xinjiang
