= Koxtag =

Koxtag قوشتاغ بازىرى 阔什塔格镇 Kuoshi Tage
- Town
- Location in Xinjiang Koxtag (China)
- Coordinates: 37°21′18″N 78°03′30″E
- Country: China
- Autonomous Region: Xinjiang
- Prefecture: Hotan
- County: Guma/Pishan

Population (2010)
  - Total: 15,200

Ethnic groups
  - Major ethnic groups: Uyghur
- Time zone: UTC+8 (China Standard)

Koxtag (Kuoshitage, Qoshtagh, Kuoshi Tage, K'o-shih-t'a-ko; قوشتاغ بازىرى / 阔什塔格镇, formerly قوشتاغ يېزىسى / 阔什塔格乡) is a town in Pishan/Guma County, Hotan Prefecture, Xinjiang, China.

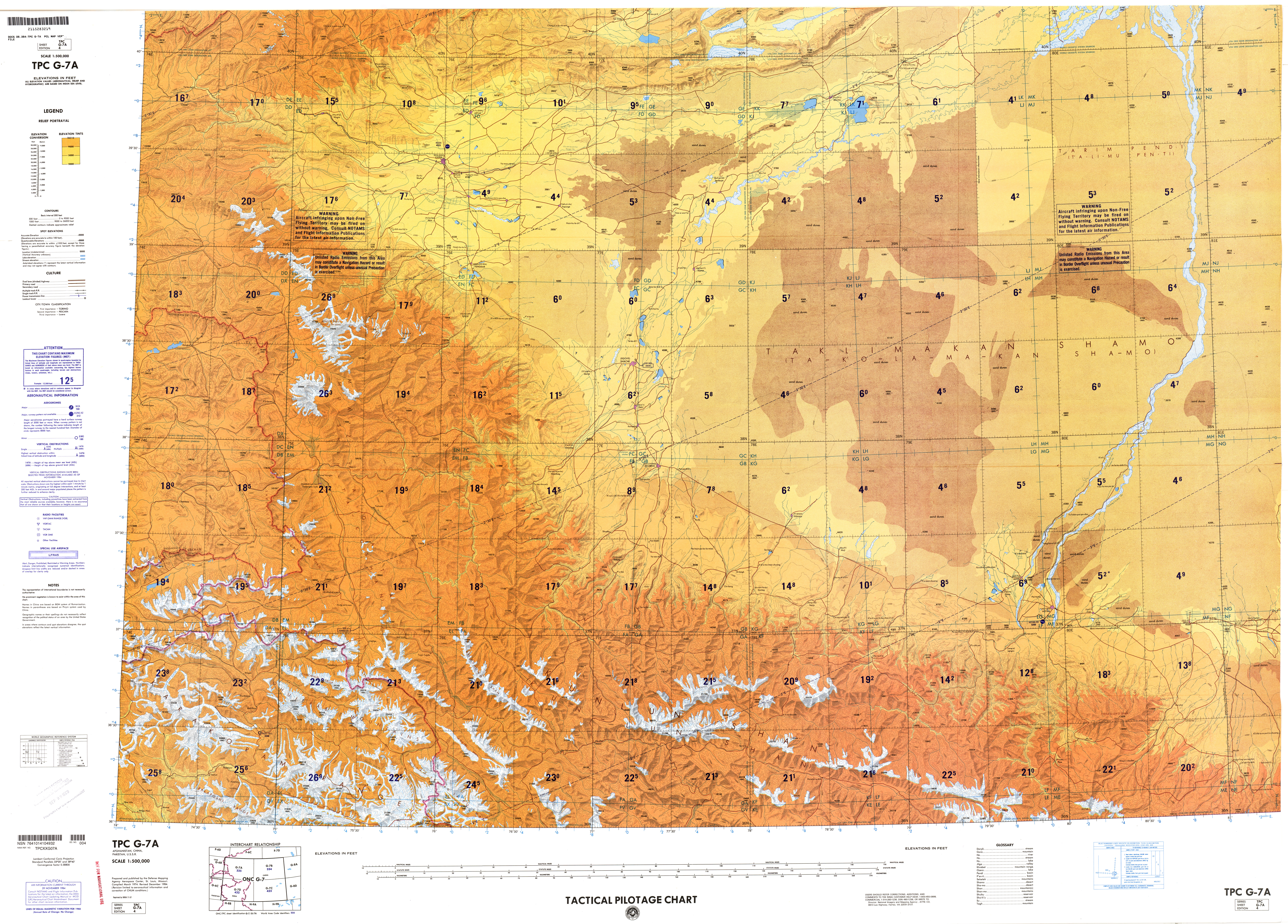
Map including Koxtag (Ko-shih-t'a-ko [sic]) (DMA, 1984)

== History ==
In 1958, Yuejin Commune ('Leap Forward commune' 跃进公社) was created.

In 1978, Yuejin Commune was renamed Koxtag Commune (Keshitage; 科什塔格公社).

In 1984, Koxtag Commune became Koxtag Township (阔什塔格乡).

The 2011 Pishan hostage crisis occurred in Koxtag.

On July 24, 2015, Koxtag was changed from a township to a town.

== Administrative divisions ==
Koxtag includes one residential community and fifteen villages:

Residential community (Mandarin Chinese Hanyu Pinyin-derived names except where Uyghur is provided):

- Kuoshitage (阔什塔格社区)

Villages:

- Sugaitelike (Sugaite Likecun; 苏盖特力克村), Kuoshitage (阔什塔格村), Bositan (博斯坦村), Azigan'aledi (阿孜干阿勒迪村), Jiayinagute (加依纳古特村), Bomuga (博木尕村), Tugemanboyi (土格曼博依村), Tiereke'aledi (铁热克阿勒迪村), Keshilake (克什拉克村), Wulebage (吾勒巴格村), Keyikeqi (克依克其村), Karesu (喀热苏村), Daiyaboyi (代亚博依村), Bashi'azigan (巴什阿孜干村), Sulighaz (Sulegazi; سۇلىغاز كەنتى / 苏勒尕孜村)

== See also ==
- List of township-level divisions of Xinjiang
