= Pixna =

Pixna پىشنا يېزىسى 皮西那乡
- Township
- Location in Xinjiang Pixna (China)
- Coordinates: 37°30′15″N 78°01′43″E
- Country: China
- Autonomous Region: Xinjiang
- Prefecture: Hotan
- County: Guma/Pishan

Population (2010)
  - Total: 7,496

Ethnic groups
  - Major ethnic groups: Uyghur
- Time zone: UTC+8 (China Standard)

Pixna (Pixina, Pishna; پىشنا يېزىسى / 皮西那乡) is a town in Pishan/Guma County, Hotan Prefecture, Xinjiang, China.

== History ==
Before the Communist takeover, the area was organized as Pixna District (Pixinai; 皮西乃區).

In 1958, Pixna Commune (皮西那公社) was established.

In 1984, Pixna Township was established.

== Administrative divisions ==
Pixna includes seven villages:

Villages (Mandarin Chinese Hanyu Pinyin-derived names):

- Jiayituogelake (Jiayituo Gelakecun; 加依托格拉克村), Wukashi (吾喀什村), Bulakebeixi (布拉克贝希村), Pixina (皮西那村), Yangtake (央塔克村), Bashi'azigan (巴什阿孜干村), Ayage'azigan (阿亚格阿孜干村)

== See also ==
- List of township-level divisions of Xinjiang
