= Guma, Pishan County =

Guma
- Town
- Location in Xinjiang Guma (China)
- Coordinates: 37°37′N 78°18′E
- Country: China
- Province: Xinjiang
- Prefecture: Kashgar Prefecture
- County: Pishan/Guma County

Guma (Goma) Town (Chinese: 固玛镇; pinyin: Gùmǎ Zhèn; Uyghur: گۇما بازىرى, Гома), also known as Pishan Town (皮山镇; Píshān), (Note: 皮亢, Pikang in the Weilüe) is a town in the Taklamakan Desert, in the Xinjiang Uyghur Autonomous Region of the People's Republic of China, about 158 km (98 mi) southeast of Kashgar. Small and rather poor, the town has about 2,000 inhabitants, most of whom are Uyghur and some Tajiks. The main crop is cotton. Pishan is served by China National Highway 315 and the Kashgar-Hotan Railway.

Guma is an ancient oasis town on the main caravan route between Khotan and Karghalik and, in Han times, the route left from here to go to Arachosia (Kandahar) through Hunza. The Hanshu (which describes events up to 23 CE) mentions that it had 500 households, 3,500 individuals and 500 persons able to bear arms. It was an important hub for caravans heading south to India over the Karakorum route or through the Pamirs to Jalalabad or Badakhshan.

== See also ==
- Silk Road transmission of Buddhism
- List of township-level divisions of Xinjiang
