= Muji Town, Hotan =

Muji مۇجى بازىرى 木吉镇 Mu-chi
- Town
- Location in Xinjiang Muji (China)
- Coordinates: 37°26′34.08″N 78°34′36.8″E
- Country: China
- Autonomous Region: Xinjiang
- Prefecture: Hotan
- County: Guma/Pishan

Population (2010)
  - Total: 23,273

Ethnic groups
  - Major ethnic groups: Uyghur
- Time zone: UTC+8 (China Standard)

Muji (Mu-chi; مۇجى بازىرى / 木吉镇, formerly مۇجى يېزىسى / 木吉乡) is a town in Pishan/Guma County, Hotan Prefecture, Xinjiang, China.

== History ==
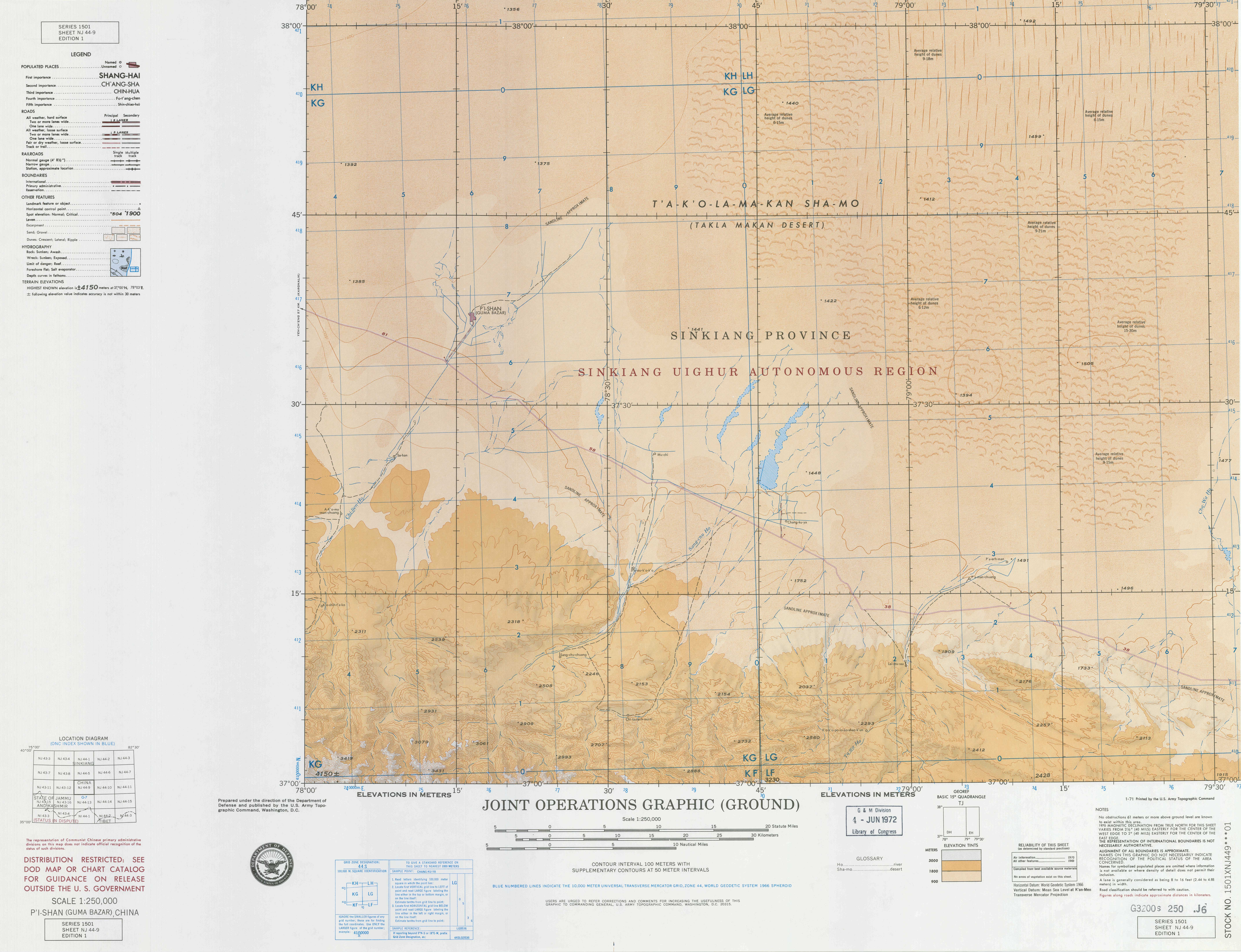
Map including Muji (labeled as Mu-chi) (ATC, 1971)

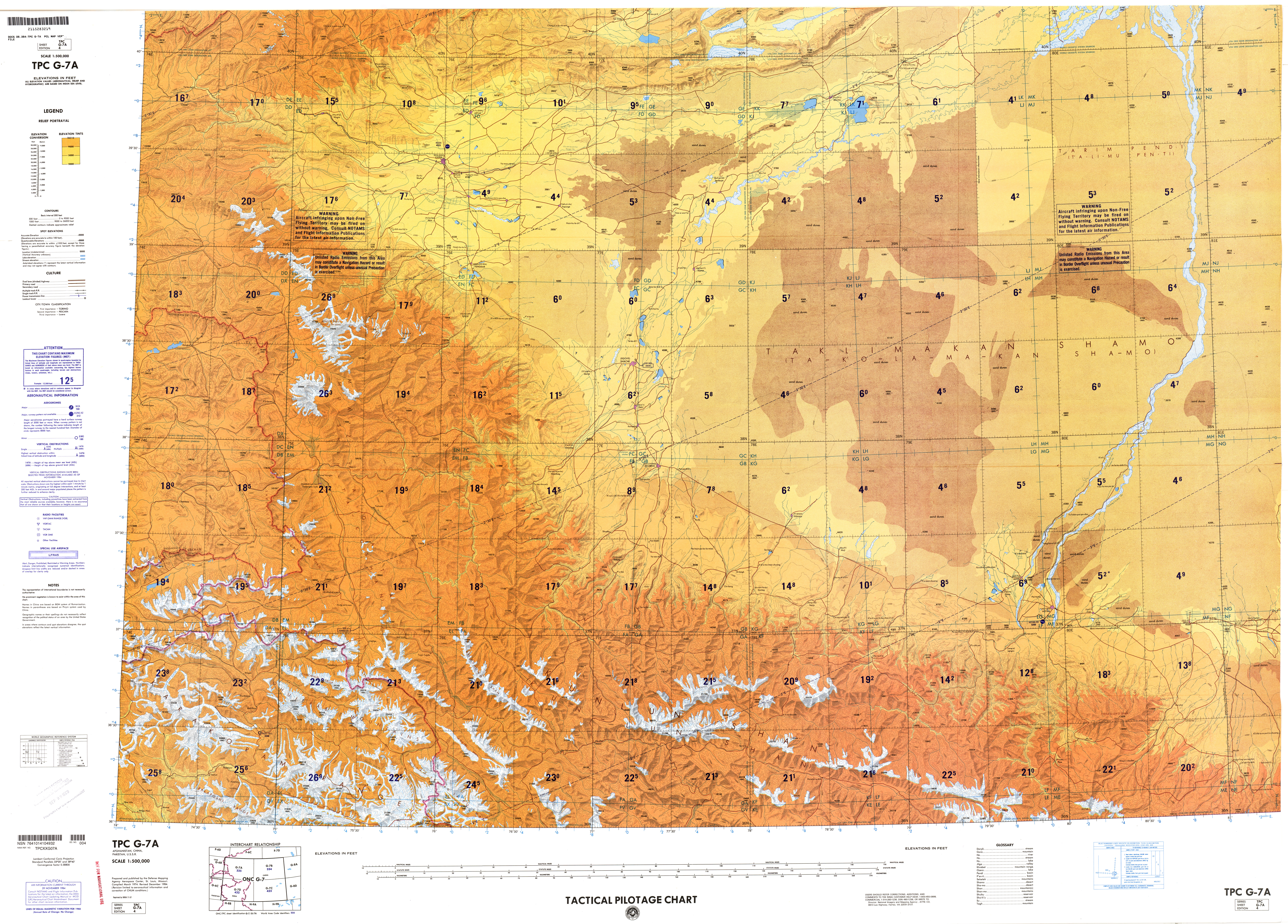
Map including Muji (DMA, 1984)

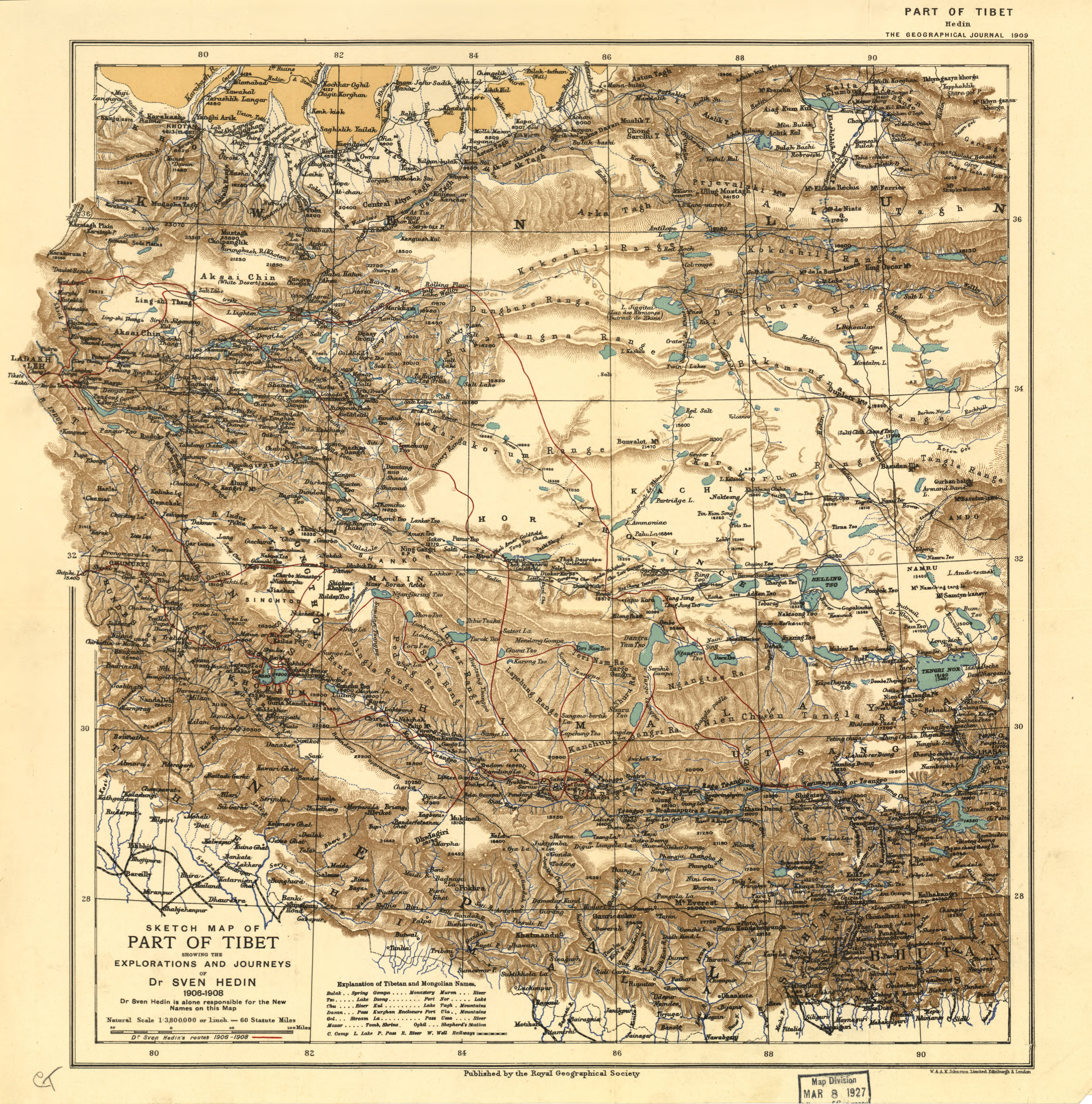
Map including Muji (RGS, early 20th century)

Before the Communist takeover, the area was organized as Muji District (木吉區).

In 1958, Bayi Commune ('August 1 Army Day Commune' 八一公社) was established.

In 1978, Bayi Commune was renamed Muji Commune (木吉公社).

In 1984, Muji Commune became Muji Township (木吉乡).

In 2012/3, Muji was changed from a township into a town.

== Administrative divisions ==
Koxtag includes three residential communities and eighteen villages:

Residential communities (Mandarin Chinese Hanyu Pinyin-derived names except where Uyghur is provided):

- Bazha (巴扎社区), Wenhua (文化社区), Tuanjie (团结社区)

Villages:

- Longga (Longgacun; لوڭگا كەنتى / 龙尕村), Langan (兰干村), Yingbage (英巴格村), Kuonasayibage (阔纳萨依巴格村), Bashitiereke (巴什铁热克村), Hantuge (汗吐格村), Aziganbage (阿孜干巴格村), Gaziqiaka (尕孜恰喀村), Muji (木吉村), Kuonatugeman (阔纳吐格曼村), Sayi (萨依村), Asa'er (阿萨尔村), Kuonabazha (阔纳巴扎村), Sayibage (萨依巴格村), Ayagebagela (阿亚格巴格拉村), Bagela (巴格拉村), Bashibagela (巴什巴格拉村), Arejianggale (阿热江尕勒村)

== Transportation ==
- China National Highway 315

== See also ==
- List of township-level divisions of Xinjiang
