= Pishan County =

Pishan County گۇما ناھىيىسى (Uyghur) 皮山县 (Chinese) Guma
- County
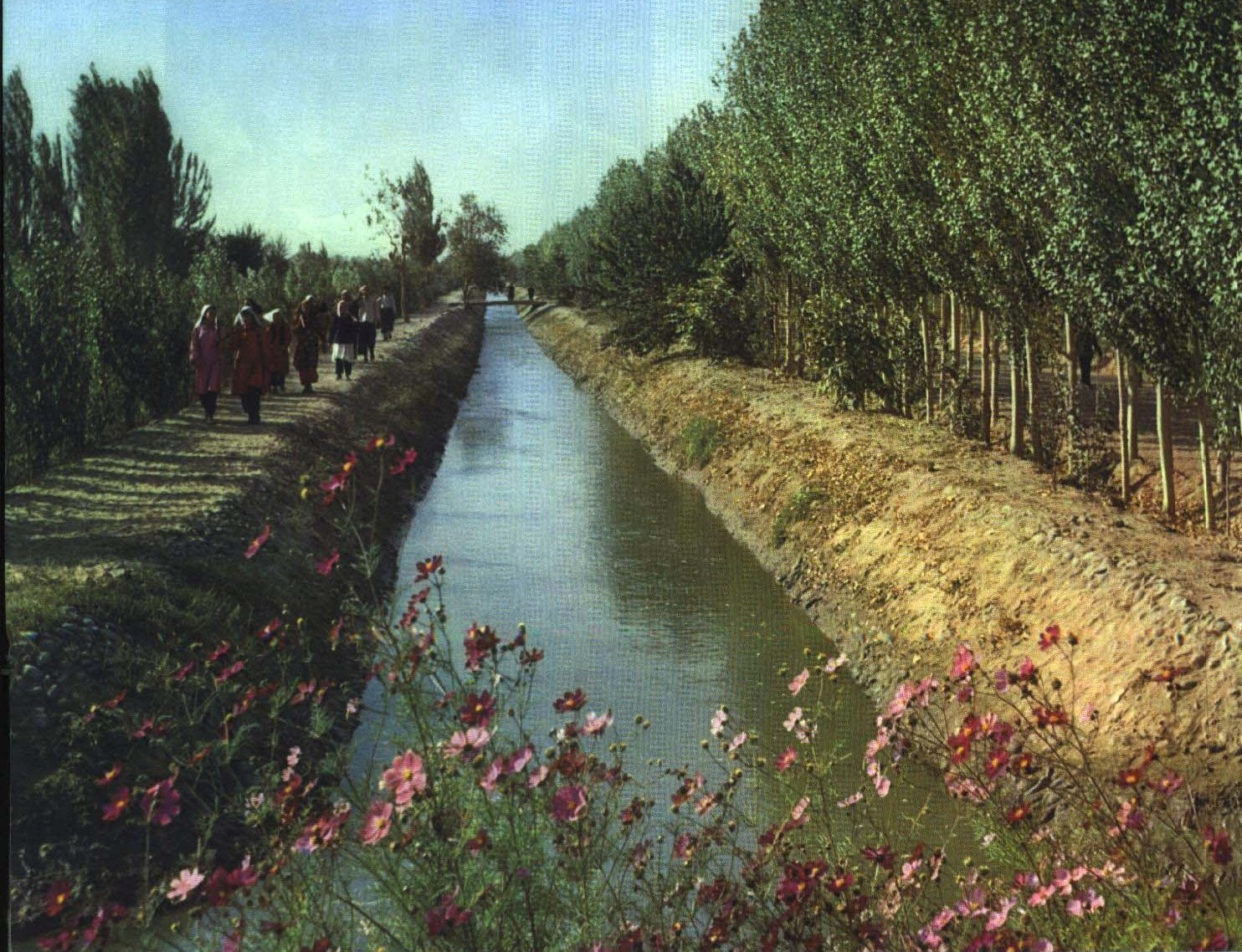

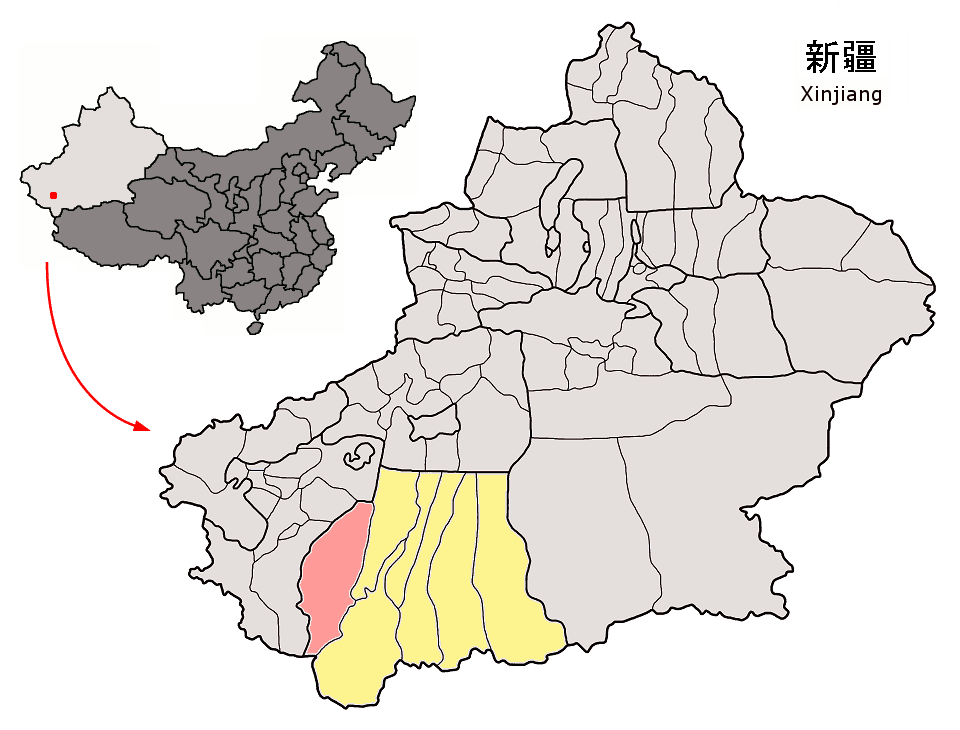
- Location of Pishan/Guma County (red) within Hotan Prefecture (yellow) and Xinjiang

- Location of the seat in Xinjiang Guma (Xinjiang) Guma (China)
- Coordinates: 37°37′N 78°17′E
- Country: China
- Autonomous region: Xinjiang
- Prefecture: Hotan
- County seat: Guma Town

Area
  - Total: 39,741.52 km^{2} (15,344.29 sq mi)

Population (2020)
  - Total: 281,573
  - Density: 7.08511/km^{2} (18.3503/sq mi)

Ethnic groups
  - Major ethnic groups: Uyghur
- Time zone: UTC+8 (China Standard (Note: Locals in Xinjiang frequently observe UTC+6 (Xinjiang Time), 2 hours behind Beijing.))
- Postal code: 845100
- Website: www.ps.gov.cn (in Chinese)

Pishan County

Uyghur name
- Uyghur: گۇما ناھىيىسى
Transcriptions
- Latin Yëziqi: Guma Nahiyisi
- Yengi Yeziⱪ: Guma Naⱨiyisi
- SASM/GNC: Guma Nahiyisi
- Siril Yëziqi: Гума Наһийиси

Chinese name
- Simplified Chinese: 皮山县
- Traditional Chinese: 皮山縣
Transcriptions
Standard Mandarin
- Hanyu Pinyin: Píshān Xiàn
- Wade–Giles: Pʻi²-shan¹ Hsien⁴

Alternative Chinese name
- Simplified Chinese: 固玛县
- Traditional Chinese: 固瑪縣
Transcriptions
Standard Mandarin
- Hanyu Pinyin: Gùmǎ Xiàn

Pishan County (Chinese: 皮山县) as the official romanized name, also transliterated from Uyghur as Guma County (Uyghur: گۇما ناھىيىسى; Chinese: 固玛县), is a county within the Xinjiang Uyghur Autonomous Region and is under the administration of the Hotan Prefecture. It contains an area of 39,412 km^{2} (15,217 sq mi). According to the 2002 census, it has a population of 220,000. The county borders Maralbexi County and Makit County to the north, Karakax County, Hotan County and Kunyu to the east and Kargilik County to the west. The county includes lands near the Karakoram Pass which are part of the Aksai Chin area that is disputed between China and India.

== History ==
In 1902, Pishan County was created from Guma, Sanju and other areas originally part of Kargilik.

In March 1950, the Pishan County People's Government was established.

In May 2010, Shahidulla (Xaidula/Saitula) was made a town.

On the night of December 28, 2011, Koxtag (Kuoshi Tage) in Pishan was the site of the 2011 Pishan hostage crisis.

In 2012/3, Muji was changed from a township into a town.

On July 3, 2015, the 2015 Pishan earthquake occurred, killing three and wounding 71.

On July 24, 2015, Koxtag was changed from a township to a town.

On January 9, 2016, Sanju was changed from a township to a town.

== Geography ==
The northern part of Pishan/Guma County is made up of sand dunes in the Taklamakan Desert. The main part of the population of the county is grouped around oasis areas at the base of the Kunlun Mountains. The southern part of the county is mountainous including the Qizil Koran Range. A prominent mountain pass in the area is Sanju Pass. A prominent lake in the area is Cuolule Co (Cuolule Cuo, Tsorūl Tso; 错鲁勒错).

== Climate ==
Climate data for Pishan, elevation 1,375 m (4,511 ft), (1991–2020 normals, extremes 1981–present)
Month	Jan	Feb	Mar	Apr	May	Jun	Jul	Aug	Sep	Oct	Nov	Dec	Year
Record high °C (°F)	19.1 (66.4)	24.8 (76.6)	31.1 (88.0)	35.0 (95.0)	37.1 (98.8)	40.3 (104.5)	41.6 (106.9)	40.6 (105.1)	36.0 (96.8)	29.7 (85.5)	25.1 (77.2)	18.7 (65.7)	41.6 (106.9)
Mean daily maximum °C (°F)	1.0 (33.8)	7.0 (44.6)	16.4 (61.5)	24.1 (75.4)	28.3 (82.9)	31.8 (89.2)	33.5 (92.3)	32.1 (89.8)	27.7 (81.9)	21.0 (69.8)	12.2 (54.0)	3.4 (38.1)	19.9 (67.8)
Daily mean °C (°F)	−5.2 (22.6)	0.8 (33.4)	9.6 (49.3)	16.9 (62.4)	21.0 (69.8)	24.5 (76.1)	26.0 (78.8)	24.8 (76.6)	20.3 (68.5)	12.9 (55.2)	4.6 (40.3)	−2.9 (26.8)	12.8 (55.0)
Mean daily minimum °C (°F)	−10.6 (12.9)	−4.9 (23.2)	3.3 (37.9)	10.1 (50.2)	14.4 (57.9)	18.0 (64.4)	19.6 (67.3)	18.6 (65.5)	13.6 (56.5)	5.6 (42.1)	−1.8 (28.8)	−8.2 (17.2)	6.5 (43.7)
Record low °C (°F)	−22.8 (−9.0)	−22.0 (−7.6)	−8.4 (16.9)	−0.1 (31.8)	4.1 (39.4)	9.1 (48.4)	11.6 (52.9)	9.4 (48.9)	1.7 (35.1)	−4.7 (23.5)	−13.3 (8.1)	−22.1 (−7.8)	−22.8 (−9.0)
Average precipitation mm (inches)	2.7 (0.11)	2.4 (0.09)	2.7 (0.11)	4.0 (0.16)	16.6 (0.65)	10.3 (0.41)	11.4 (0.45)	8.7 (0.34)	5.4 (0.21)	0.6 (0.02)	1.6 (0.06)	1.2 (0.05)	67.6 (2.66)
Average precipitation days (≥ 0.1 mm)	2.3	1.8	1.2	1.5	2.7	3.6	3.9	3.0	1.9	0.4	0.6	1.8	24.7
Average snowy days	5.1	2.8	0.6	0.1	0	0	0	0	0	0	0.6	3.7	12.9
Average relative humidity (%)	57	47	33	30	34	37	41	43	45	43	45	56	43
Mean monthly sunshine hours	178.8	173.3	210.1	229.7	269.0	280.2	274.4	243.3	244.0	263.0	220.2	180.6	2,766.6
Percentage possible sunshine	58	56	56	57	61	64	62	59	67	77	74	61	63
Source: China Meteorological Administration all-time February high

== Administrative divisions ==
The county is made up of 1 subdistrict, 6 towns, 8 townships, 2 ethnic townships, and two other areas:

Name	Simplified Chinese	Hanyu Pinyin	Uyghur (UEY)	Uyghur Latin (ULY)	Administrative division code	Notes
Subdistrict
Pishan County Subdistrict	皮山县街道	Píshān Xiàn Jiēdào	گۇما كوچا باشقارمىسى	guma kocha bashqarmisi	653223001	
Towns
Guma Town	固玛镇	Gùmǎ Zhèn	گۇما بازىرى	guma baziri	653223100	
Duwa Town	杜瓦镇	Dùwǎ Zhèn	دۇۋا بازىرى	duwa baziri	653223101	
Shahidulla Town	赛图拉镇	Sàitúlā Zhèn	شەيدۇللا بازىرى	sheydulla baziri	653223102	
Muji Town	木吉镇	Mùjí Zhèn	مۇجى بازىرى	muji baziri	653223103	formerly Muji Township (مۇجى يېزىسى / 木吉乡)
Koxtag Town	阔什塔格镇	Kuòshítǎgé Zhèn	قوشتاغ بازىرى	qoshtagh baziri	653223104	formerly Koxtag Township (قوشتاغ يېزىسى / 阔什塔格乡)
Sanju Town	桑株镇	Sāngzhū Zhèn	سانجۇ بازىرى	sanju baziri	653223105	formerly Sanju Township (سانجۇ يېزىسى / 桑株乡)
Towns
Kilian Township	克里阳乡	Kèlǐyáng Xiāng	كىلىياڭ يېزىسى	kiliyang yëzisi	653223201	
Kokterak Township	科克铁热克乡	Kēkètiěrèkè Xiāng	كۆكتېرەك يېزىسى	köktërek yëzisi	653223202	
Choda Township	乔达乡	Qiáodá Xiāng	چودا يېزىسى	choda yëzisi	653223205	
Mokoyla Township (Mo-kuei-la)	木奎拉乡	Mùkuílā Xiāng	موكويلا يېزىسى	mokoyla yëzisi	653223206	
Zangguy Township	藏桂乡	Zàngguì Xiāng	زاڭگۇي يېزىسى	zangguy yëzisi	653223207	
Piyalma Township	皮亚勒玛乡	Píyàlèmǎ Xiāng	پىيالما يېزىسى	piyalma yëzisi	653223208	
Pixna Township	皮西那乡	Píxīnà Xiāng	پىشنا يېزىسى	pishna yëzisi	653223209	
Bashlengger Township	巴什兰干乡	Bāshénlángàn Xiāng	باشلەڭگەر يېزىسى	bashlengger yëzisi	653223210	
Ethnic townships
Nawabat Tajik Ethnic Township	垴阿巴提塔吉克民族乡	Nǎo'ābātí Tǎjíkè Mínzúxiāng	ناۋئابات تاجىك يېزىسى	naw'abat tajik yëzisi	653223211	(Sarikoli) ناۇئاباد تۇجىك دىيۇر; Nouobod Tujik diyur (Note: There is no official orthography for Sarikoli in China. This is the spelling used in the Sarikoli-Chinese dictionary written by linguist Gao Erqiang.)
Kangkir Kyrgyz Ethnic Township	康克尔柯尔克孜民族乡	Kāngkè'ěr Kē'ěrkèzī Mínzúxiāng	كەڭقىر قىرغىز يېزىسى	kengqir qirghiz yëzisi	653223212	(Kyrgyz) كەڭقىر قىرعىز ايىلى; Кеңқыр Кыргыз айылы

Other:

- Pishan Sanxia Industrial Park (سەنشىيا گۇما ناھىيىلىك باغچىلاشقان سانائەت رايونى, 皮山三峡工业园区)

== Economy ==
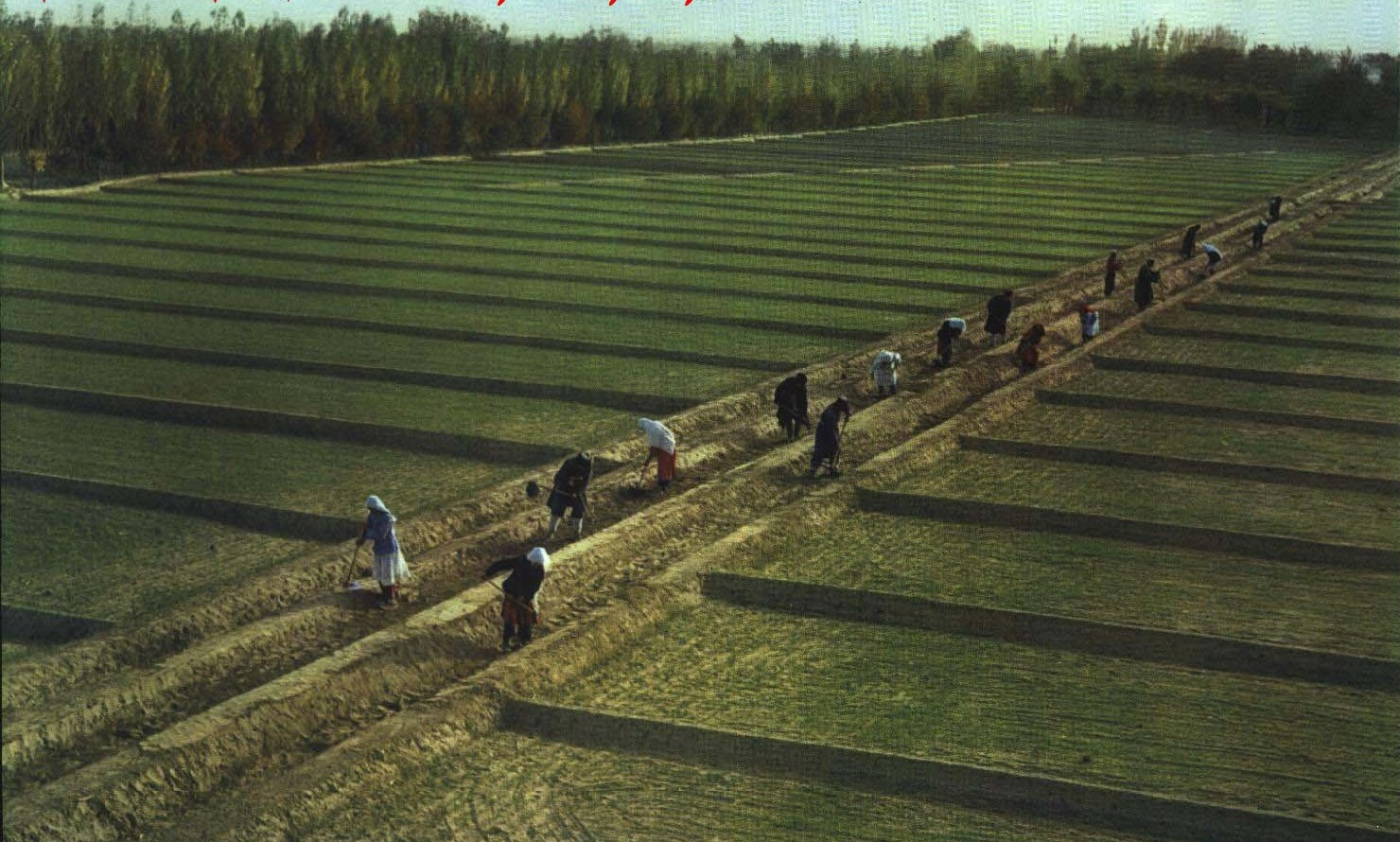
Fields in the county

The county produces rice, wheat, cotton, apricots, peaches, grapes, silkworms and furs. Coal, gypsum and mica are mined in the county. Industries include tractor repair, carpet making and food processing. Local specialities include sangpi paper and walnuts.

As of 1885, there was about 54,600 acres (360,891 mu) of cultivated land in Guma.

== Demographics ==
Historical population
Year	Pop.	±% p.a.
2000	216,024	—
2010	258,210	+1.80%

In the late 2010s, ethnic minorities made up 98.4% of the population of the county, mainly Uyghurs. In 2011, Han Chinese accounted for less than 2% of the population of Pishan.

As of 2015, 290,016 of the 296,075 residents of the county were Uyghur, 3,788 were Han Chinese and 2,271 were from other ethnic groups.

As of 1999, 97.85% of the population of Guma (Pishan) County was Uyghur and 1.32% of the population was Han Chinese.

== Transportation ==
- China National Highway 219
- China National Highway 315

== Notable persons ==
- Ablajan Awut Ayup, pop singer
- Ghojimuhemmed Muhemmed, modern poet
- Osmanjan Muhemmed Pas'an, modern poet

== Historical maps ==
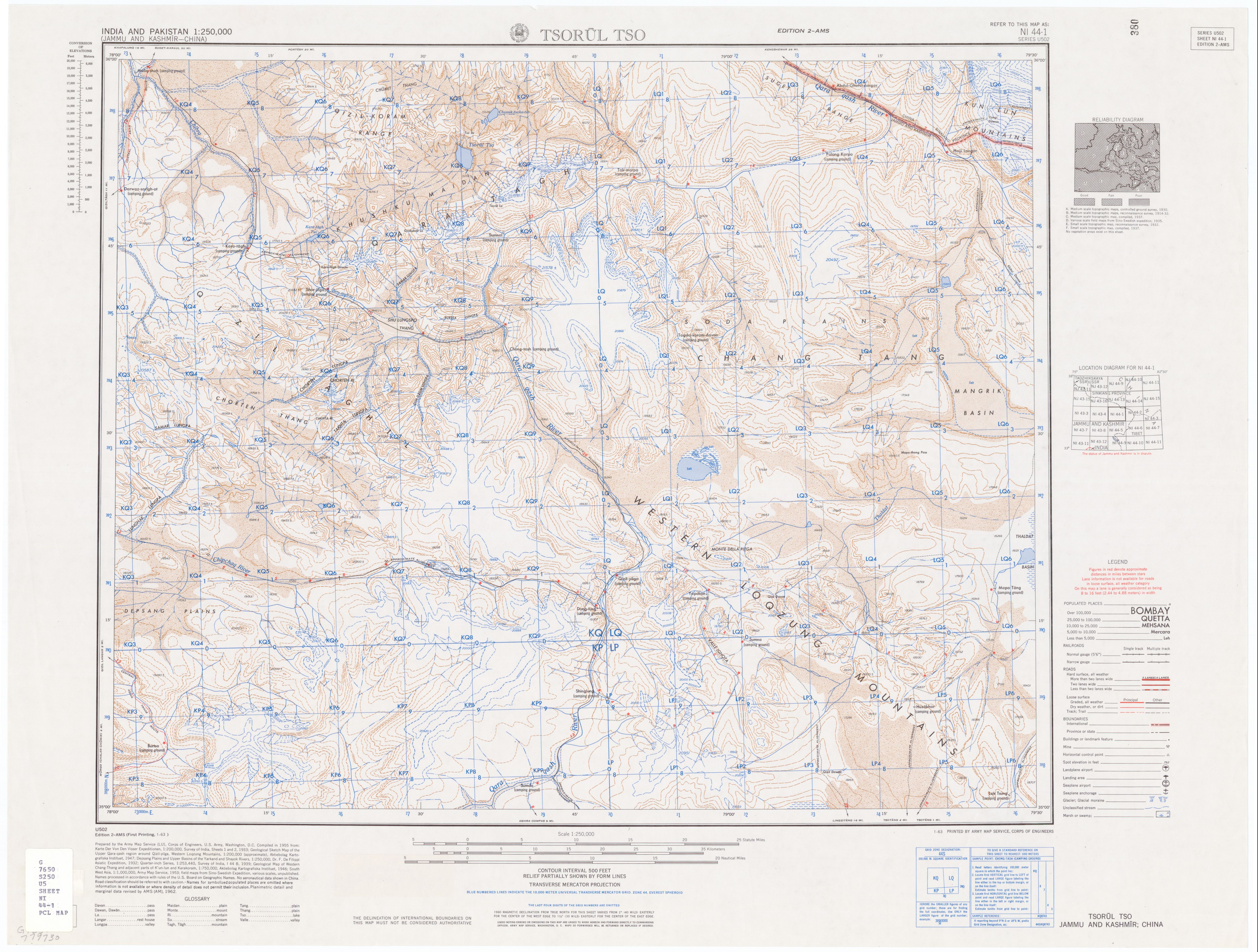
Map including Cuolule Co (labeled as Tsorūl Tso) in southern Pishan County (AMS, 1955) (Note: From map: "THE DELINEATION OF INTERNATIONAL BOUNDARIES ON THIS MAP MUST NOT BE CONSIDERED AUTHORITATIVE")

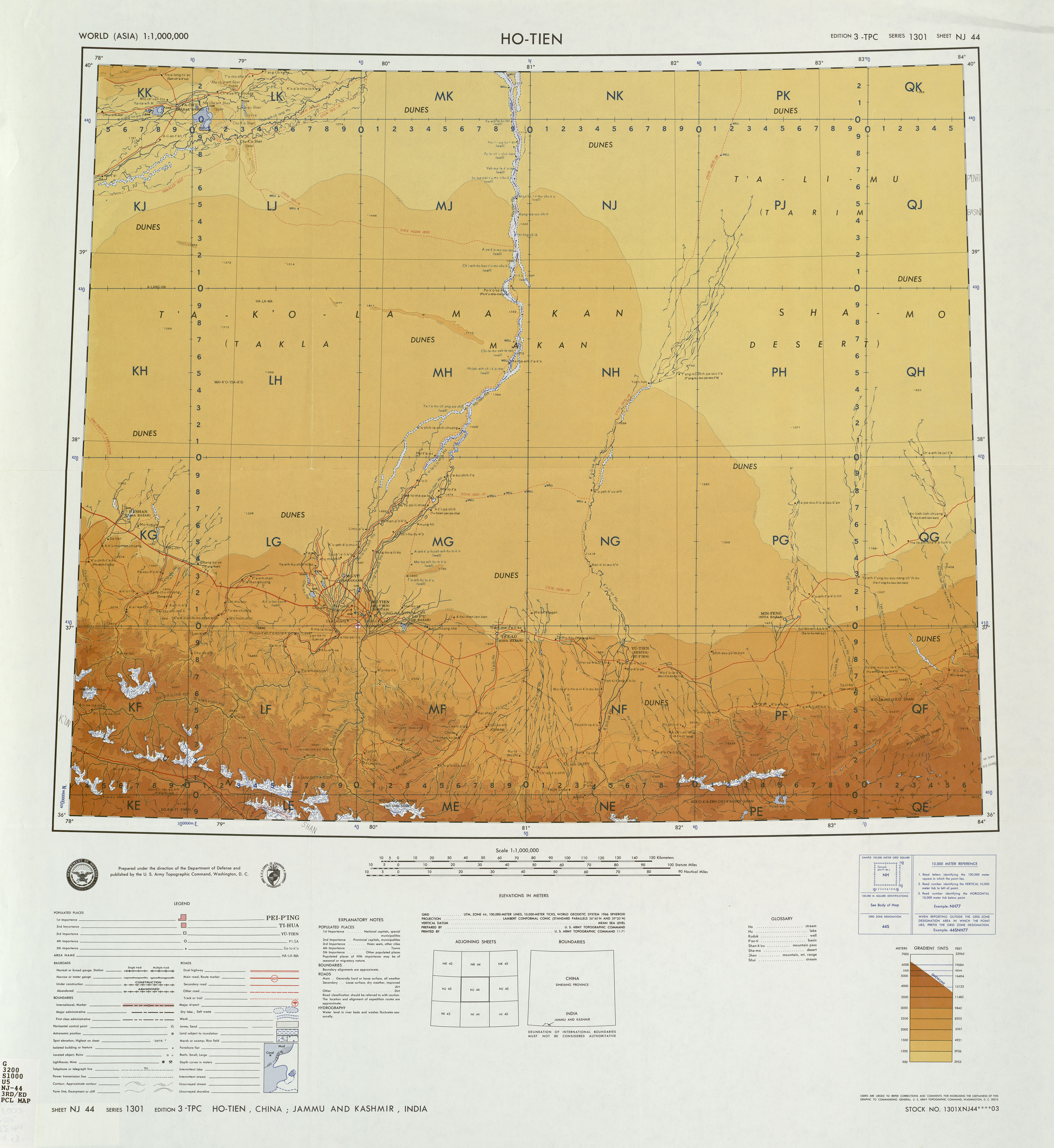
Map including Pishan (labeled as P'I-SHAN (GUMA BAZAR)) and the northern part of the county (USATC, 1971) (Note: From map: "DELINEATION OF INTERNATIONAL BOUNDARIES MUST NOT BE CONSIDERED AUTHORITATIVE".)

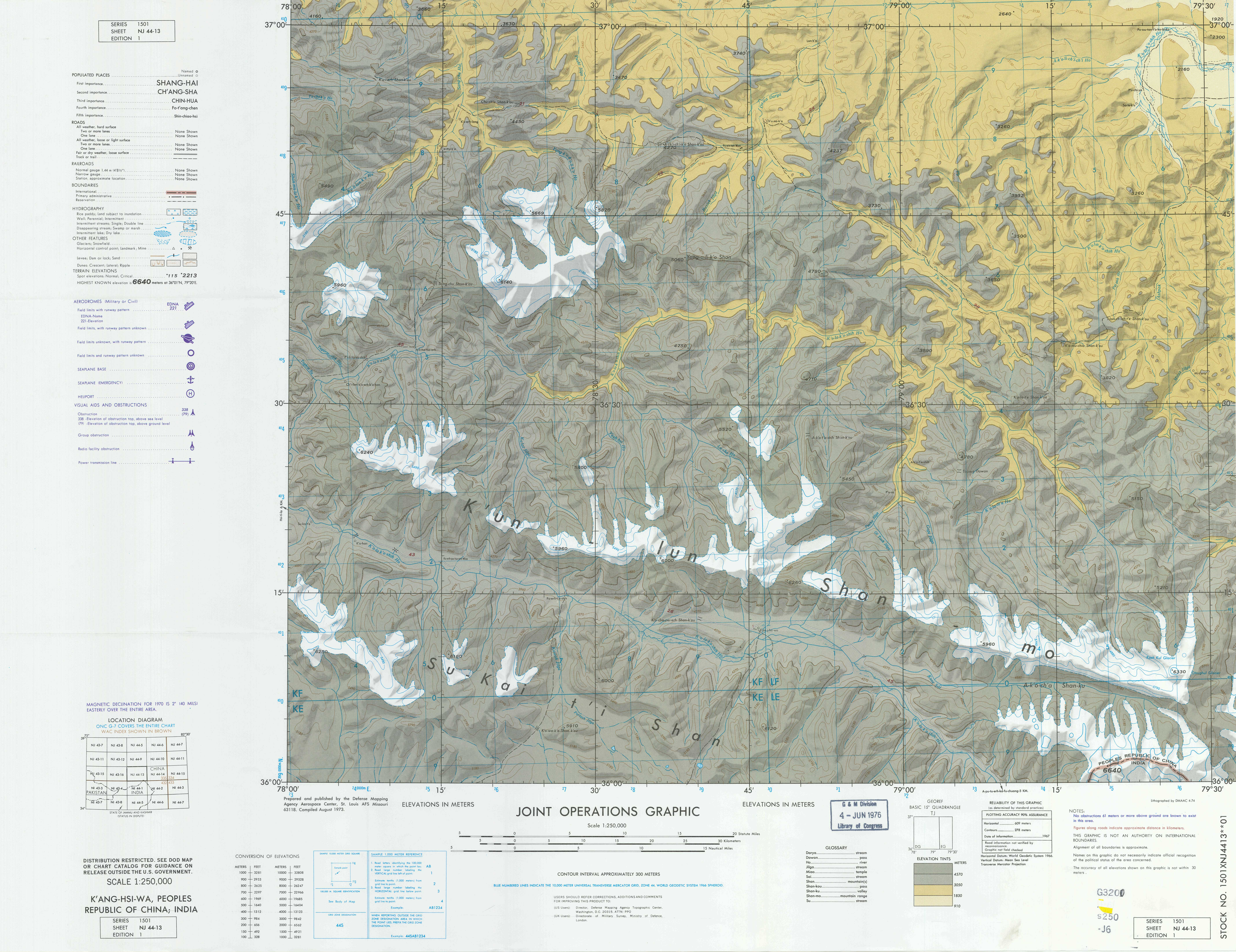
Map including part of southern Guma (Pishan) County (DMA, 1973)

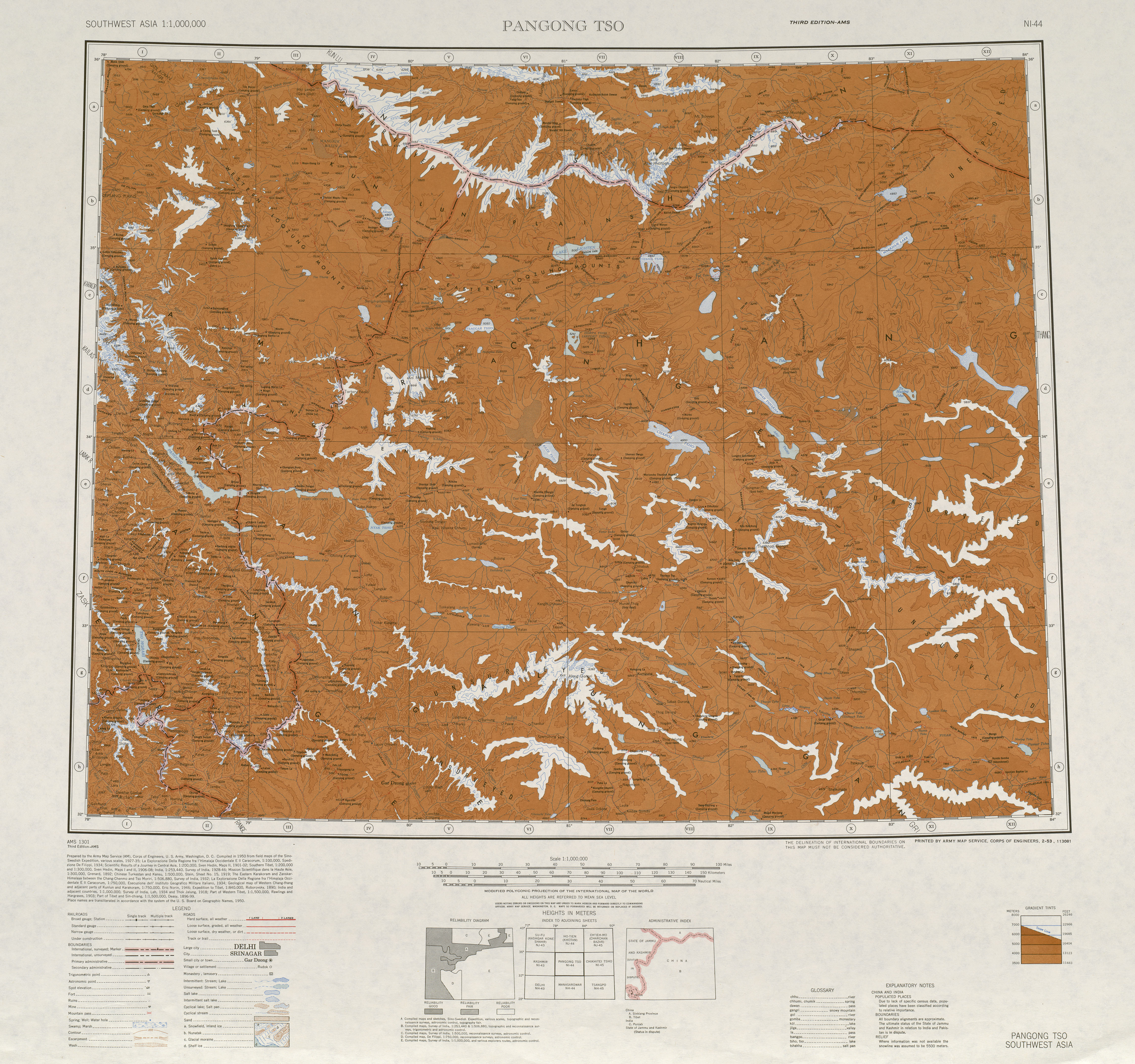
Map including the southern part of the county and areas disputed between China and India (AMS, 1950) (Note: From map: "THE DELINEATION OF INTERNATIONAL BOUNDARIES ON THIS MAP MUST NOT BE CONSIDERED AUTHORITATIVE.".)

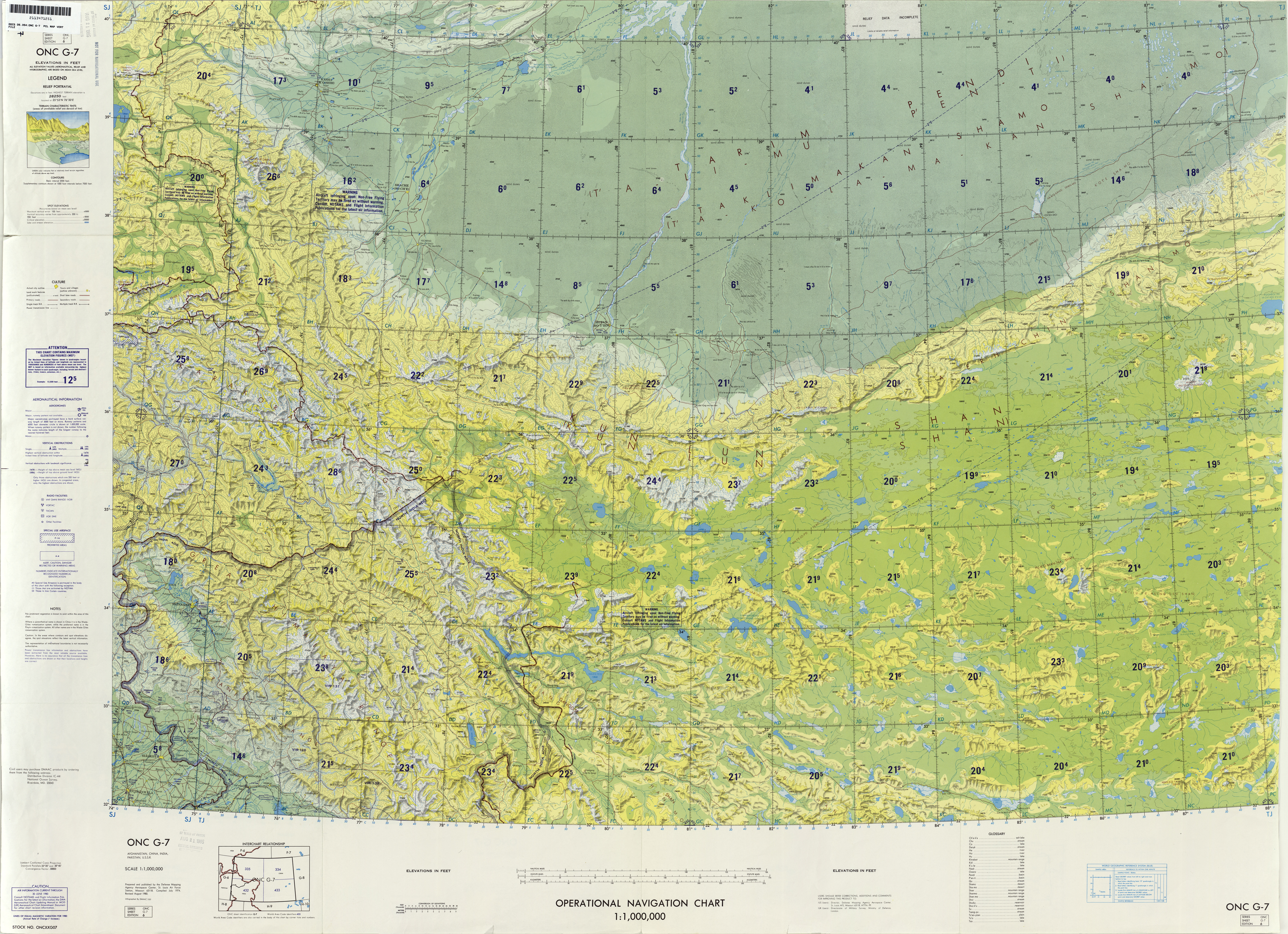
Map including Pishan (labeled as PISHAN (P'I-SHAN)) and surrounding region (DMA, 1980) (Note: From map: "The representation of international boundaries is not necessarily authoritative.")
