= List of archaeological sites of the Taklamakan and Lop Desert =

This list is of the archaeological sites of the Taklamakan Desert and Lop Desert in China.

== Sites ==
Site	Prefecture/Municipality (modern)	Province (modern)	Comments (ancient place connections, cross-links and resources)	Image	Coordinates
Achik-ilek	Kuqa County	Xinjiang	In the vicinity of ancient Kucha. Exact location unclear. Images of the site on the IDP project. There are two Lion sculptures recovered from the site by the German Turfan expeditions. Images are viewable here: Right-looking Lion sculpture Left-looking Lion sculpture		
Aduna-kora		Inner Mongolia			41°29′31″N 101°06′16″E
Afraisiab					
Aksipil		Xinjiang			37°12′44″N 80°07′45″E
Akterek		Xinjiang			37°07′00″N 80°10′30″E
Anxi		Gansu			40°31′50″N 95°57′00″E
Aratam		Xinjiang			42°52′45″N 93°51′00″E
Astana	Turpan	Xinjiang			42°52′53″N 89°31′36″E
Balawaste		Xinjiang			37°03′00″N 81°05′00″E
Bashkoyumal		Xinjiang			38°58′30″N 88°01′00″E
Beiting	Turpan Prefecture	Xinjiang	Turpan		44°05′00″N 89°05′00″E
Bezeklik	Turpan Prefecture	Xinjiang	Turpan		42°57′11″N 89°32′24″E
Chonghassar		Xinjiang			42°39′10″N 89°31′45″E
Dandan Uiliq		Xinjiang			37°47′20″N 81°05′05″E
Domoko		Xinjiang			37°06′07″N 81°04′41″E
Duldulokur		Xinjiang			41°41′00″N 82°42′00″E
Dunhuang Limes		Gansu			
Dunhuang - Mogao	Dunhuang	Gansu			40°02′32″N 95°22′14″E
Endere					
Endere Fort					
Farhad-Beg-yailaki	Hotan Prefecture	Xinjiang			37°11′45″N 81°03′55″E
Ghagha-sharh					
Hanguya		Xinjiang			37°10′20″N 80°13′45″E
Iledong					
Jigdalik					41°34′01″N 81°39′00″E
Kakshal Tati					
Karadong		Xinjiang			38°32′00″N 81°52′15″E
Karayantak					
Keriya River		Xinjiang			
Khadalik					
Kharakhoja					
Kharakhoto		Inner Mongolia			41°45′51″N 101°08′36″E
Khora		Xinjiang			
Kichikhassar		Xinjiang			42°39′10″N 89°33′30″E
Kizil Caves		Xinjiang			41°47′00″N 82°30′00″E
Knocha River					
Koyumal					
Kucha					
Kudukkol					
Kumtura					41°42′00″N 82°41′00″E
Loulan		Xinjiang			40°30′20″N 89°45′00″E
Mazar Tagh		Xinjiang			38°27′06″N 80°41′09″E
Mazartoghrak					
Melikawat					36°57′04″N 79°53′32″E
Mingoi site					41°56′34″N 86°20′03″E
Miran		Xinjiang			39°16′00″N 88°49′30″E
Miran Fort		Xinjiang			39°15′30″N 88°50′30″E
Murtuk		Xinjiang			42°58′30″N 89°27′00″E
Nanhu		Gansu			39°55′00″N 94°15′00″E
Niya		Xinjiang			37°06′36″N 82°53′13″E
Rawak		Xinjiang			37°12′17″N 80°56′56″E
Sampula					
Sengim		Xinjiang			42°56′00″N 89°39′00″E
Shorchuk		Xinjiang			41°59′34″N 86°13′16″E
Siyelik					
Subashi					41°51′16″N 83°24′08″E
Tajik					
Tallikbulak					
Tamoghil					
Tashkurghan					37°46′22″N 75°13′28″E
Togujai					
Toyuk		Xinjiang			42°50′00″N 89°37′00″E
Tumshuk		Xinjiang			
Ulugh-mazar					
Uzun-tati		Xinjiang			37.280900N, 80.948200E
Vashshahri					
Yarkhoto		Xinjiang			42°57′02″N 89°03′50″E
Yingpan					
Yotkan					
Yutogh					42°51′00″N 89°52′00″E

== See also ==
- International Dunhuang Project
