= Mahāsaṃnipāta Sūtra =

Sutra in Mahāyāna Buddhism

The Mahāvaipulya Mahāsaṃnipāta Sūtra (Chinese: 大方等大集經, pinyin: Dàfāng děng dà jí jīng, Great Extensive Great Collection Sūtra) is a Mahayana Buddhist anthology of Mahayana sutras.

The sutra was translated into Chinese three times. The only extant copy of the entire collection is found in Chinese, though the individual sutras can be found in Sanskrit and in the Tibetan canon. The anthology consists of 17 sutras across 60 fascicles.

== Overview ==
Image of Sāgaramati bodhisattva from Jana Bahal, Nepal. Sāgaramati bodhisattva appears as a main character in the Sāgaramatiparipṛcchā.

The Mahāsaṃnipāta Sūtra is an important collection of Mahayana sutras for the Indian Mahayana commentary tradition. The sutras in this collection were important sources for Indian anthologies like the Śikṣāsamuccaya of Shantideva and the Sūtrasamuccaya. It is also a major source for the Ratnagotravibhāga which especially relies on the Dhāraṇiśvararāja Sūtra. The sutra was also important in Central Asian Buddhism, and it is cited in the Book of Zambasta along with the Prajñāpāramitā and Buddhāvataṃsaka sutras.

The Mahāsaṃnipāta was also an important source for the East Asian Buddhist tradition, and it was translated numerous times by some of the preeminent translators of Chinese Buddhism. It was one of the first Mahayana sutras translated into Chinese as it was first translated by the 2nd century CE figure Lokakṣema (though his translation is no longer extant). Another version of the Mahāsaṃnipāta, also now lost, was translated by Kumārajīva in the early 5th century. Another translation was carried out by Dharmakṣema from 414 to 421 (of fascicles I-XI & XIII) which is the basis for the version that is now extant as Taishō Tripiṭaka no. 397. This version was further completed with the addition of the missing Akṣayamatinirdeśa Sūtra by Zhiyan and Baoyun (fascicle XII, c. 427) and by further translations of Narendrayaśas (fascicles XIV-XVII, c. 586 CE).

The entire Mahāsaṃnipāta does not survive in the Tibetan canon. However, various independent chapters are preserved in Tibetan translations (chapter 1-2, 3, 5, 8, 9, 11, 12). The colophons and titles of these independent Tibetan translations mention that they are part of the Mahāsaṃnipāta collection.

The sutras of the Mahāsaṃnipāta Sūtra discuss all of the main topics of Mahayana Buddhism. As such it is a major source for Mahayana teachings on the bodhisattva path, bodhicitta, non-duality, dhāraṇī, and the decline of Dharma.

The Dhāraṇīśvararāja sūtra (also known as the Tathāgatamahākaruṇānirdeśa) was very influential on Indian Buddhism. This sutra is a key source for the Ratnagotravibhāga an important Indian treatise on Buddha-nature. The Ratnagotravibhāga draws on the Dhāraṇīśvararāja for all seven of its main topics and for its discussions of the triratnavaṃśa (lineage of the three jewels). The Dhāraṇīśvararāja also explicitly points out that the nature of the minds of sentient beings is fundamentally pure (cittaprakrtivisuddhi), even if they are bound by the adventitious afflictions. This is a key notion also found in the Ratnagotravibhāga.

The Dhāraṇīśvararāja sūtra is also an important source for the Tibetan tradition's understanding of the three turnings of the wheel of Dharma since it describes the Buddha's teaching as consisting of three phases.

The Candragarbha sutra was particularly influential because it enumerates the notion of the decline of the Dharma, or decline of the Buddha's teachings, dividing this into three eras. This teaching was very influential on Pure Land Buddhism in general as well as on Japanese Buddhist schools of the Kamakura period, such as Shinran's Jōdo Shinshū, the largest Buddhist tradition in Japan.

== Content ==
The Chinese edition of the Mahāsaṃnipāta Sūtra (Taisho Tripitaka no. 397) contains the following sutras:

1. Jewelled Ornamentation (fascicle 1a)
2. Dhāraṇīśvārarāja Bodhisattva (fascicles 1b-4)
3. Ratnadārikā (fascicles 6-7)
4. Animiṣa Bodhisattva (fascicle 7)
5. Sāgaramati Bodhisattva (fascicles 8-11), also known as Sāgaramatiparipṛcchā
6. Avācya Bodhisattva (fascicle 12)
7. Anabhilāpya Bodhisattva (fascicle 13)
8. Gaganagañja (Sky Jewel) (fascicle 14-18)
9. Ratnaketu (fascicles 19-21), also known as Ratnaketu-dhāraṇī-sūtra
10. Gaganacakṣus (fascicles 22-24),
11. Ratnacūḍa Bodhisattva (fascicles 25-26)
12. Akṣayamati Bodhisattva, also known as Akṣayamatinirdeśa Sūtra (fascicles 27-30)
13. Sūryaguhya (fascicles 31-33)
14. Sūryagarbha (fascicles 34-45)
15. Candragarbha (fascicles 46-56)
16. Sumerugarbha (fascicles 57-58)
17. Bodhisattvas of the Ten Directions (fascicles 59-60)

== English translations ==
Some parts of the sutra have been translated into English. 84000.co currently contains five translations of individual sutras:

- Teaching on the Great Compassion of the Tathāgata (Tathāgatamahākaruṇānirdeśa) (Tōh. no. 147) which corresponds to the Dhāraṇīśvārarāja Bodhisattva sutra.
- Questions of Sāgaramati (Sāgaramatiparipṛcchā) (Tōh. no. 152)
- The Ratnaketu Dhāraṇī (Ratnaketudhāraṇī) (Tōh. no. 138)
- Teaching of Akṣayamati (Akṣayamatinirdeśa) (Tōh. no. 175)
- The Quintessence of the Sun (Sūryagarbha) (Tōh. no. 257)

Furthermore, Jaehee Han includes a translation of the Gaganagañja sūtra in thesis The Sky as a Mahāyāna Symbol of Emptiness and Generous Fullness: A Study and Translation of the Gaganagañjaparipṛcchā (University of Oslo October 2020).

The Chinese version of the Mahāsaṃnipāta is currently being translated by Alexander James O'Neill (along with Āloka Dharmacakṣus and Charles Patton). As of 2026, two volumes have been published:

- The Great Collection Sūtra: A Translation of the Mahāsaṃnipāta Sūtra Volume One (2023).
- The Great Collection Sūtra: A Translation of the Mahāsaṃnipāta Sūtra Volume Two (2026)

== Sūtras of the Mahāsaṃnipāta Section ==
The Chinese Buddhist Canon also included various other sūtras which seemed to have been associated with the Mahāsaṃnipāta. These are found in the Mahāsaṃnipāta Section (Dàjí bù, Taishō Tripiṭaka Volume 13) of the Chinese canon. These sūtras are:

- Four versions of the Ākāśagarbha Sūtra (T.405-408), equivalent to Tōh. no. 260, Āryākāśagarbhanāmamahāyānasūtra
- The Sūtra on the Contemplation of Ākāśagarbha Bodhisattva (T.409),
- Four versions of the Daśacakra-kṣitigarbha Sūtra or Kṣitigarbha-praṇidhāna Sūtra (T410-413),
- Two versions of the Bodhisattvabuddhānusmṛtisamādhi Sūtra (T414-415),
- Four versions of the Bhadrapālaparivarta or Pratyutpannasamādhi Sūtra (T.416-419),
- two versions of the Vikurvāṇarājaparipṛcchā Sūtra (T.420-421),
- The Mahāyāna King of Similes Sūtra (T.422),
- Two versions of the Saṃghāṭa Sūtra (T.423-424).

== See also ==
- Mahāratnakūṭa Sūtra
- Buddhāvataṃsaka Sūtra
- Vimalakirti Sutra

== Sources ==
- Braarvig, Jens. (1993). Akṣayamatinirdeśasūtra, vol. II: The Tradition of Imperishability in Buddhist Thought, Oslo: Solum forlad.
- O'Neill, Alexander James; Dharmacakṣus, Āloka; Patton, Charles (2023). The Great Collection Sūtra: A Translation of the Mahāsaṃnipāta Sūtra, Volume One. Dharmakāya Books. ISBN 978-1-7394725-0-4.
