= Buddhism in Khotan =

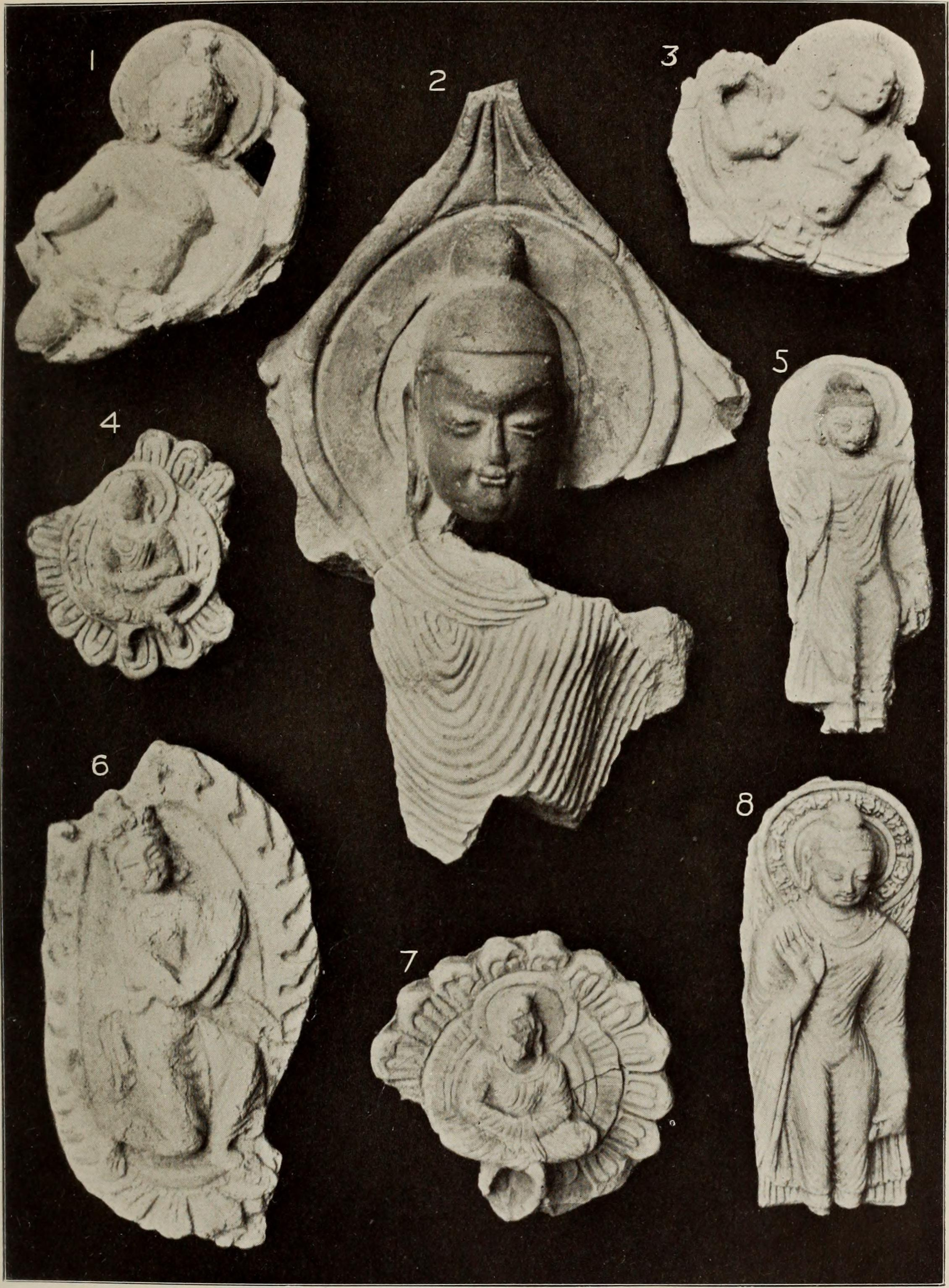
Remains of stucco relievos from wall decoration of various Buddhist ruins near Khotan.

Buddhism in Khotan comprised bodies of Buddhist religious doctrine and institutions characteristic of the Iranic Kingdom of Khotan as well as much of Western China and Tajikistan. It was the state religion of the Kingdom of Khotan until its collapse in 1000. The dominant school of Buddhism in Khotan was the Mahāsāṃghika school - from which the Mahayana and Vajrayana schools would develop. The kingdom's vast collection of texts, which included the indigenous Book of Zambasta and a Khotanese translation of the Sanghata Sutra (the earliest translation of the Sanskrit text to date), helped Khotan influence the Buddhist practices of its neighbors, most notably Tibet.

== History ==
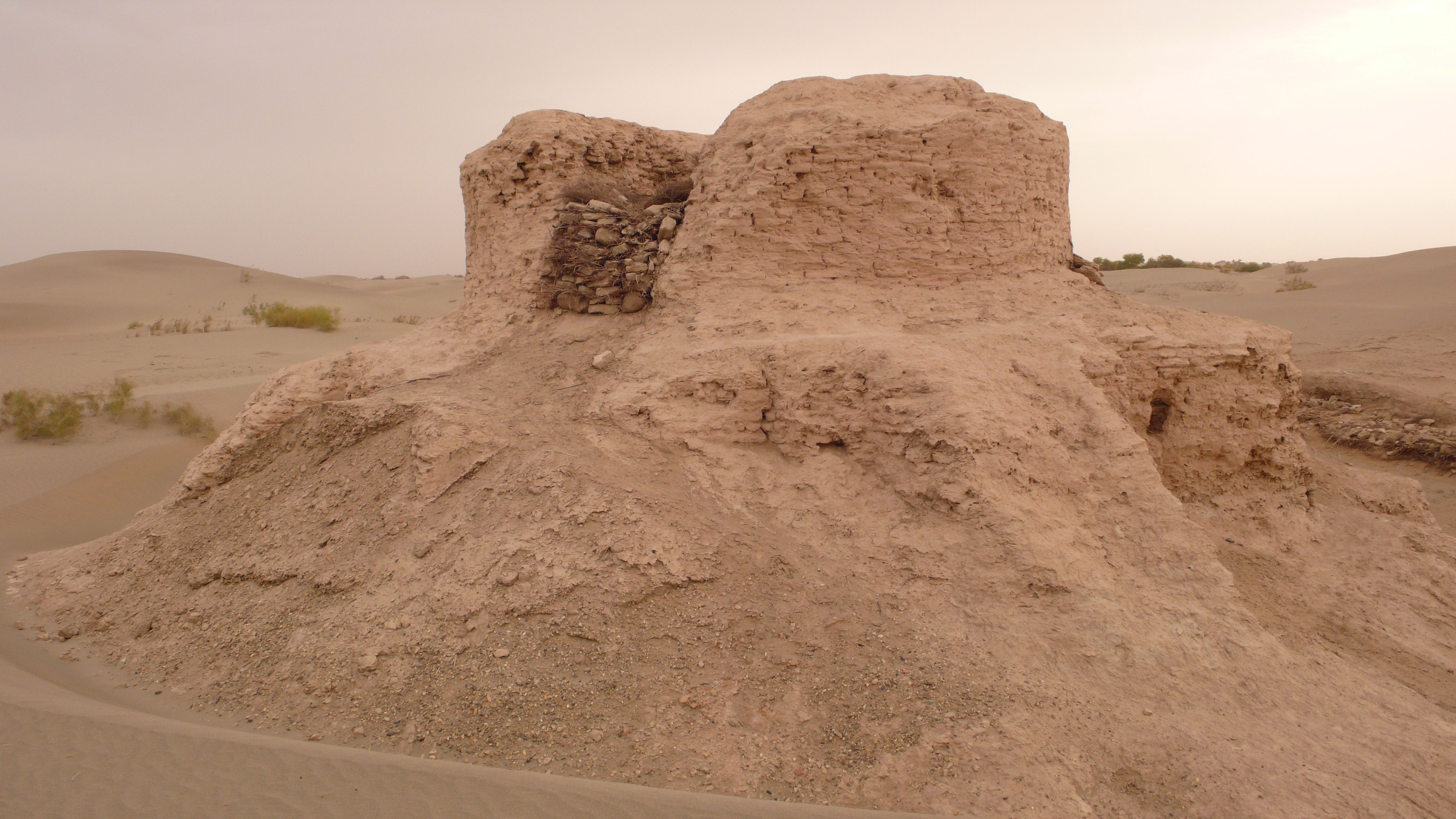
Ruins of the Rawak Stupa outside of Hotan, a Buddhist site dated from the late 3rd to 5th century AD.

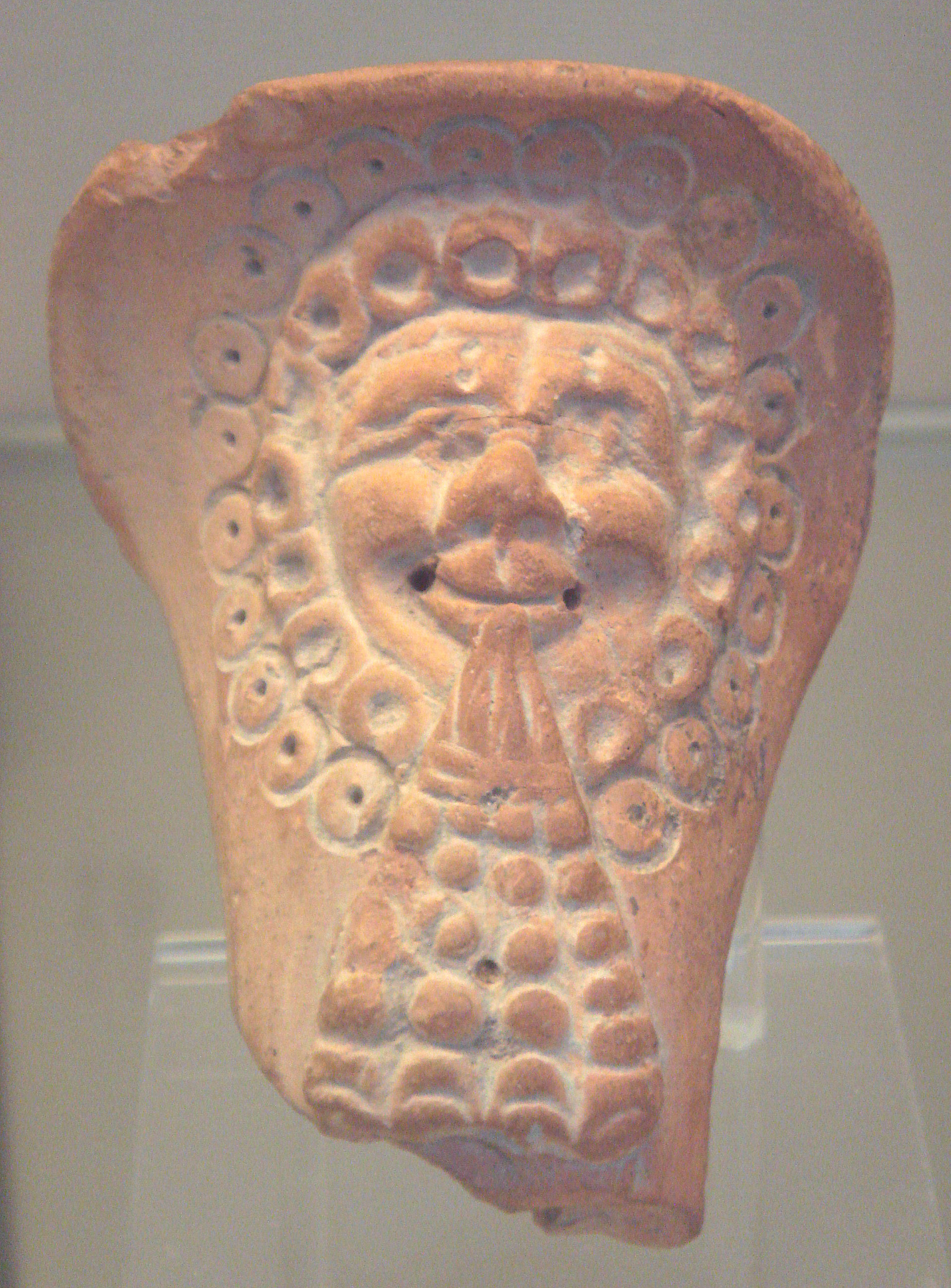
Ceramic figurine with Western influences, Yotkan near Khotan, 2-4th century AD.

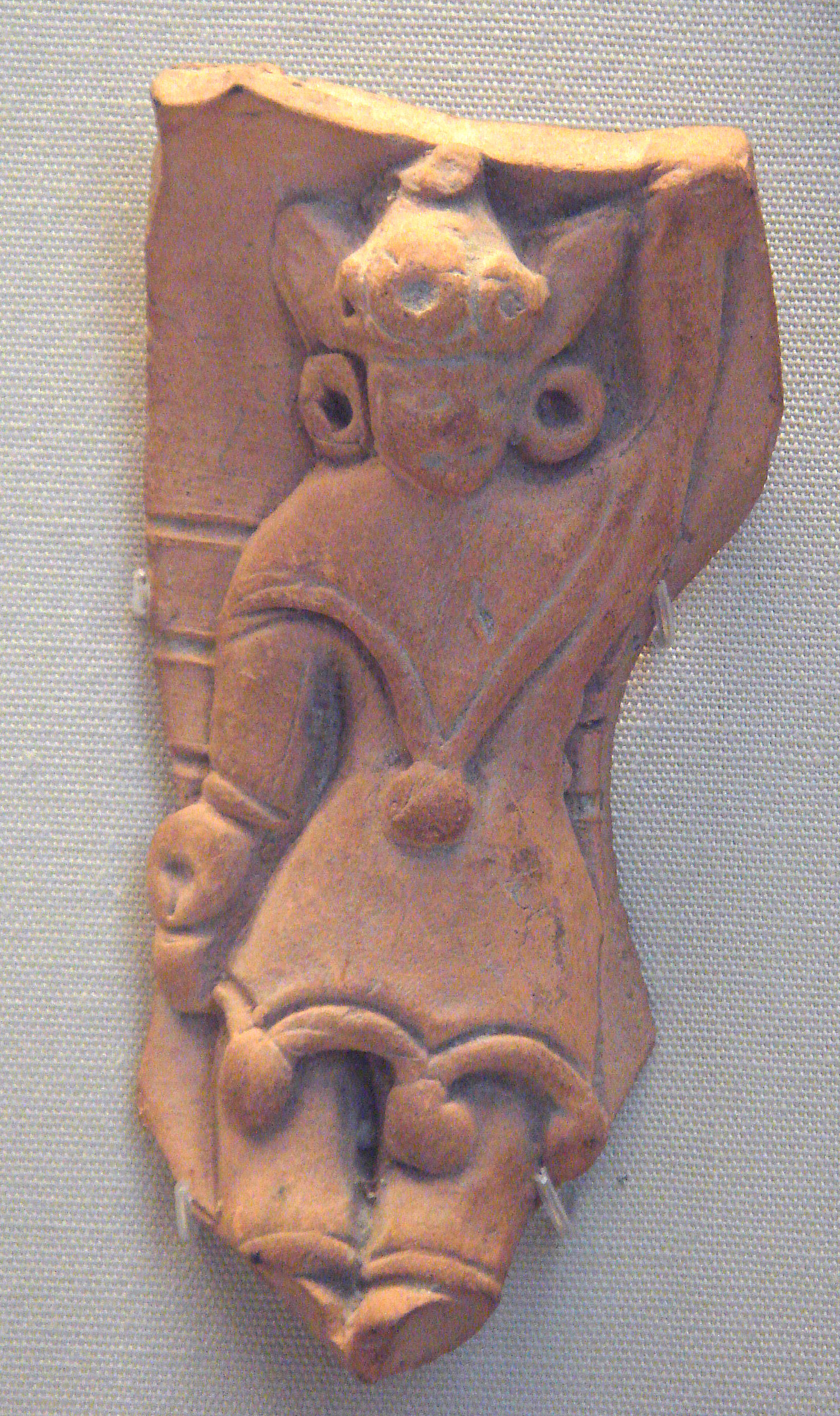
Ceramic figurine showing Western influences, Yotkan near Khotan, 2-4th century AD.

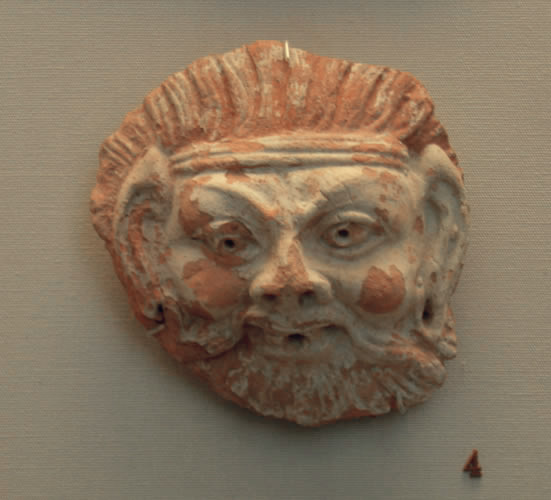
Grotesque face, stucco, found at Khotan, 7th-8th century.

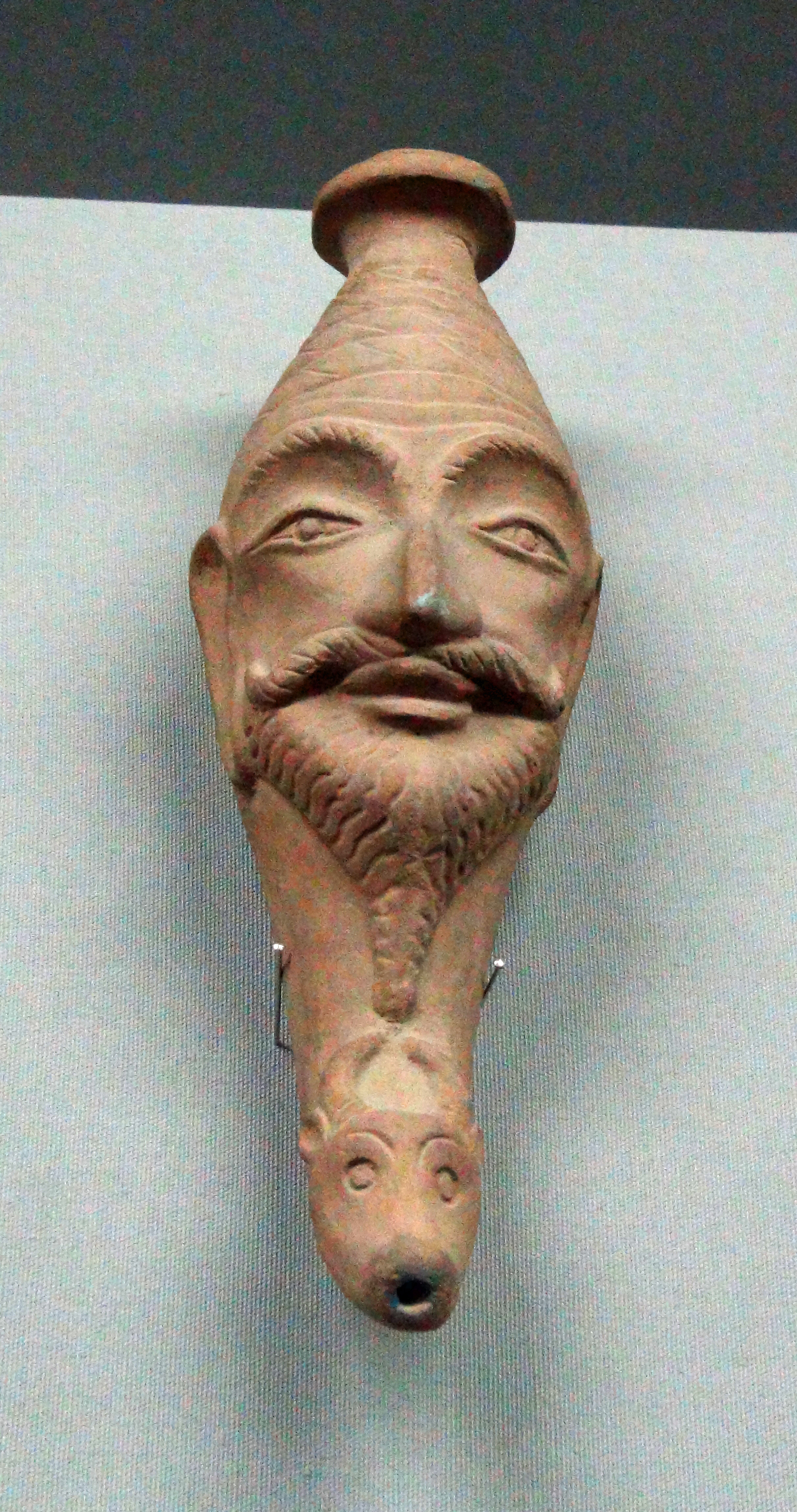
Human head ceramic with cow, Tang Dynasty.

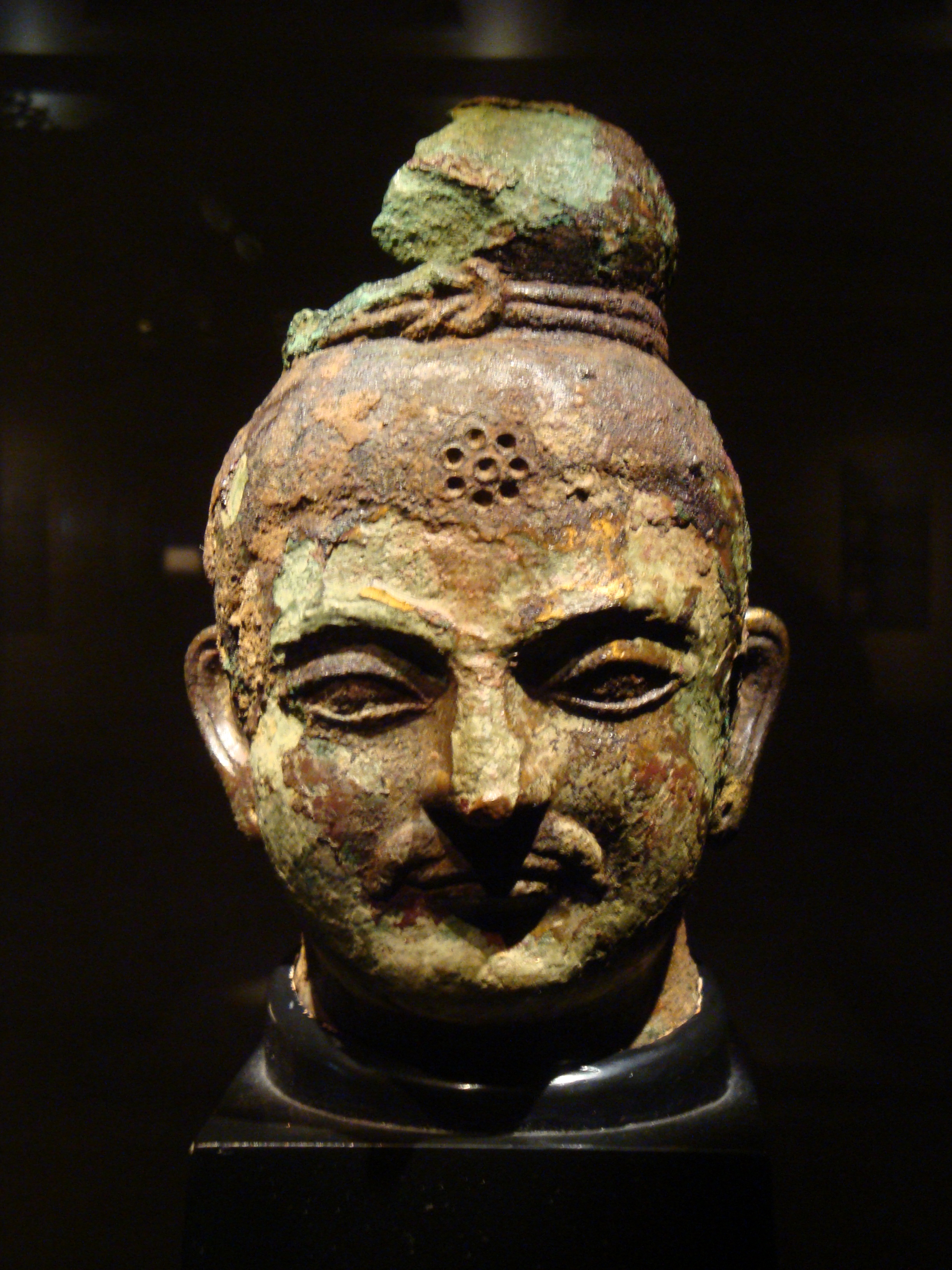
Head of Buddha found in Khotan, 3rd-4th century

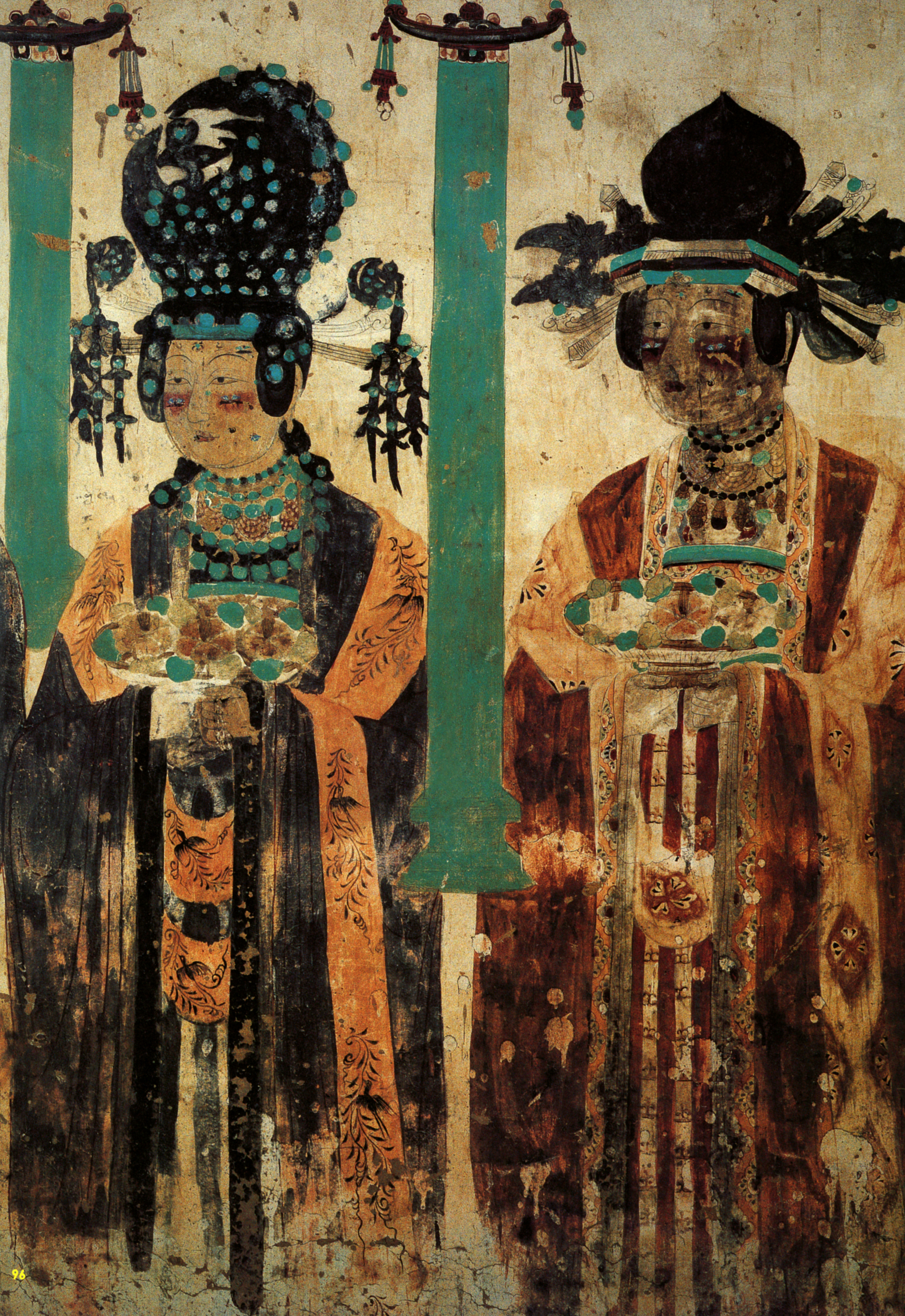
Khotanese Buddhist women donors

Local legend suggests that one of the Indian Emperor Ashoka's sons, Kushtana Maurya, founded the Central Asian city of Khotan, once the capital of a prominent Buddhist kingdom alongside the famous Silk Road. According to this same legend, Ashoka's son was abandoned by his father and nurtured by the Earth, with the ground swelling in the shape of a female breast. For this reason the child was named "Earth's Breast", or Go-stana. As he grew up, settlers from the Indian subcontinent and China began to settle within the oasis surrounding the "Earth's breast." Together with an unnamed son of the Chinese emperor, the son of Ashoka helped Indian expatriates settle within the region and found a city named after the son, called Khotan. Even so, the Chinese pilgrim Xuanzang and Tibetan records both suggest that Buddhism would not be introduced to the kingdom until Go-stana's grandson Vijayasambhava was born 170 years after the city's establishment. In Vijayasambhava's fifth year of life, according to Xuanzang, a Kashmiri missionary named Vairocana arrived in Khotan and practiced meditations in the woods. Gaining the people's interest, he became a spiritual teacher for the Khotanese people and established the first Buddhist convent in Khotan. His contributions helped introduce Vijayasambhava to the concepts of Buddhism, thus founding the Vijaya dynasty within Khotan and ultimately laying the foundations for the Buddhist faith to become its official religion by 130 BCE.

However, an account by the Han general Ban Chao suggested that the people of Khotan in 73 AD still appeared to practice Mazdeism or Shamanism His son Ban Yong who spent time in the Western Regions also did not mention Buddhism there, and with the absence of Buddhist art in the region before the beginning of Eastern Han, it has been suggested that Buddhism may not have been adopted in the region until the middle of the second century AD.

A thriving Silk Road center of trade, the Kingdom of Khotan quickly established trade, diplomatic and religious relationships with its neighbors, most notably with Ancient China. While Khotan's relations with the Chinese were initially not smooth due to an ill-fated revolt that killed a Chinese commander in the 2nd century, the Khotanese sent embassies to the Three Kingdoms between 202 and 222 CE. This led to the formation of close relations with the Jin Dynasty throughout the fifth and sixth centuries. Because of Khotan's expansion and relations with its neighbors, its culture and its interpretations of Buddhism became a melting pot of all the cultures that existed along the Silk Road.

By 665 CE., the Tibetan army had conquered the city of Khotan. Ironically, while the Tibetans occupied the Khotanese kingdom, it was the Khotanese who influenced the Tibetans. This was most notable in the cases of the technical vocabulary and the translation techniques used for Buddhist texts. Much like the modern-day Tibetan alphabet, the Khotanese alphabet utilized a Cursive Gupta script, most likely influenced by Sanskrit from its nearby neighbors. While writing down a translation of a Sanskrit work, Khotanese scribes would render Buddhist technical vocabulary though an etymology of each syllable. This helped the Khotanese maintain the accuracy of their translations, even if they were more concise than the Sanskrit and Pali originals. The Tibetans had long sought to translate Buddhist Sanskrit texts in a more efficient matter, because at that time they did not share a common alphabet. The occupation of the Central Asian kingdom however gave Tibetans an opportunity to learn the Khotanese alphabet. By the 9th Century, the Tibetans had adapted the Khotanese alphabet for their language.

While Islam had earlier been introduced into Central Asia, it was not until 982 C.E. when the Islamic Kara-Khanid Khanate of Kashgar began to invade the Kingdom of Khotan. By the time the city of Khotan fell to the Karakhanids in 1006 AD, most of the residual monks had already fled to Tibet, taking many of their sacred texts with them. Not long after the Karakhanids began their occupation, Islam became the dominant religion in Khotan, marking an end of Buddhism in the region.

== Practice of Buddhism in Khotan ==
=== Monastic life ===
Monastic communities stood as a key component within Khotanese Buddhist culture. An example of this importance was noted by Chinese pilgrim Faxian, who wrote about his four-month stay within the Kingdom. En route to India and Sri Lanka to obtain Buddhist scriptures, Faxian quickly found that the capital city's monasteries made plenty of room for monks who traveled across the Silk Road. He also found that the monasteries provided provisions necessary for him to continue his pilgrimage. Within the walls of Gomati (a monastery within Khotan), he took special note of the silent, disciplined lifestyle within the monasteries: "When [the monks] enter the refectory, their demeanour is marked by a reverent gravity, and they take their seats in regular order, all maintaining a perfect silence. No sound is heard from their alms-bowls and other utensils. When any of these pure men require food, they are not allowed to call out (to the attendants) for it, but only make signs with their hands."

While the Gomati and Gosirsa monasteries remain the most well known thanks to their documentation by the famous Chinese pilgrims Faxian and Xuanzang, the kingdom was once home to over a hundred monasteries, accommodating more than five thousand monks. Recently, archaeological evidence was found approximately 28 kilometers south of the modern town of Hotan. While today there exist only crumbling walls, shards of pottery and tops of large buildings today, the ruins of Melikawat once housed a complex of royal administrative buildings and monasteries. An epicenter of Khotan's religious and political culture, Melikawat stands as a major archaeological clue to the once thriving Buddhist culture within the region.

Another temple that helped define Khotanese Buddhist traditions was Tuopulukedun, an area that holds one of the best preserved Buddhist temples discovered to date in the region of Khotan. Originally constructed during the 7th century, the site in Tuopulukedun was excavated from September 20 to August, 2010. The remains of the wooden and earth-built temple measured 40 by 20 meters long and were built on wooden frames with outer layers of earth. Within the temple lay fragments of well-preserved sculptures and painted frescos of the Buddha and his disciples. Throughout the four walls of the temple were paintings that depicted with painstaking detail the characters who appeared within the Mahayana scriptures. Despite being within this rather confined space, the archaeologists found brightly colored frescos to be abundant within the temple, more so than any other temple within the region. In the center of the painted interior stood a 60-foot tall stone statue of Siddartha Gautama Moreover, statues and carvings of the Buddha and his Bodhisattvas were commonplace within temples. The statues and the frescos reflected different influences from different regions of Asia, perhaps due to Khotan's convenient location in the Silk Road. While the statues reflected Bactrian and Greco-Buddhist influence, the painted frescos on the walls were a prelude to those later found in Tibetan and Chinese Buddhist monasteries.

=== Processionals ===
In addition to helping foreign monks with their pilgrimages, Khotanese Buddhism was woven closely into the very fabric of Khotanese culture. This led not only to the construction of thriving local monastic communities, but also encouraged Khotanese citizens to incorporate the Buddhist faith into their life. This is particularly the case during the first two weeks of June, when processional ceremonies were practiced. Everyone from the Khotanese royal family to the common merchants and laborers would come together within the capital city and, during these two weeks, would offer carriages to the King's New Monastery [Faxian]. Lavishly filled with what Faxian refers to as the seven precious substances (the Sapta-ratna: gold, silver, lapis lazuli, rock crystal, rubies, diamonds or emeralds, and agate). and prominently displaying an image of the Buddha with two Boddhisatvas on the side, one carriage was carried per day throughout the two-week holiday.

When (the car) was a hundred paces from the gate, the king put off his crown of state, changed his dress for a fresh suit, and with bare feet, carrying in his hands flowers and incense, and with two rows of attending followers, went out at the gate to meet the image; and, with his head and face (bowed to the ground), he did homage at its feet, and then scattered the flowers and burnt the incense. When the image was entering the gate, the queen and the brilliant ladies with her in the gallery above scattered far and wide all kinds of flowers, which floated about and fell promiscuously to the ground. In this way everything was done to promote the dignity of the occasion. The carriages of the monasteries were all different, and each one had its own day for the procession

=== Farhad-beg-yailaki ===
Farhad-beg-yailaki lies on the southern Silk Road in the Kingdom of Khotan. Sir Mark Aurel Stein explored the remains of Buddhist shrines there which he dated from the fourth to sixth century AD. Stein discovered Buddha statues wearing robes with bright floral designs on which had piles of fabrics offered at their feet in worship. Stein concluded that there was evidence of contact with many cultures in Farhad-beg-yailaki. Murals found there depicted two important Buddhist mythological figures, Hariti and Avalokitesvara, draped in cloth with Sassanian designs on.

=== Balawaste ===
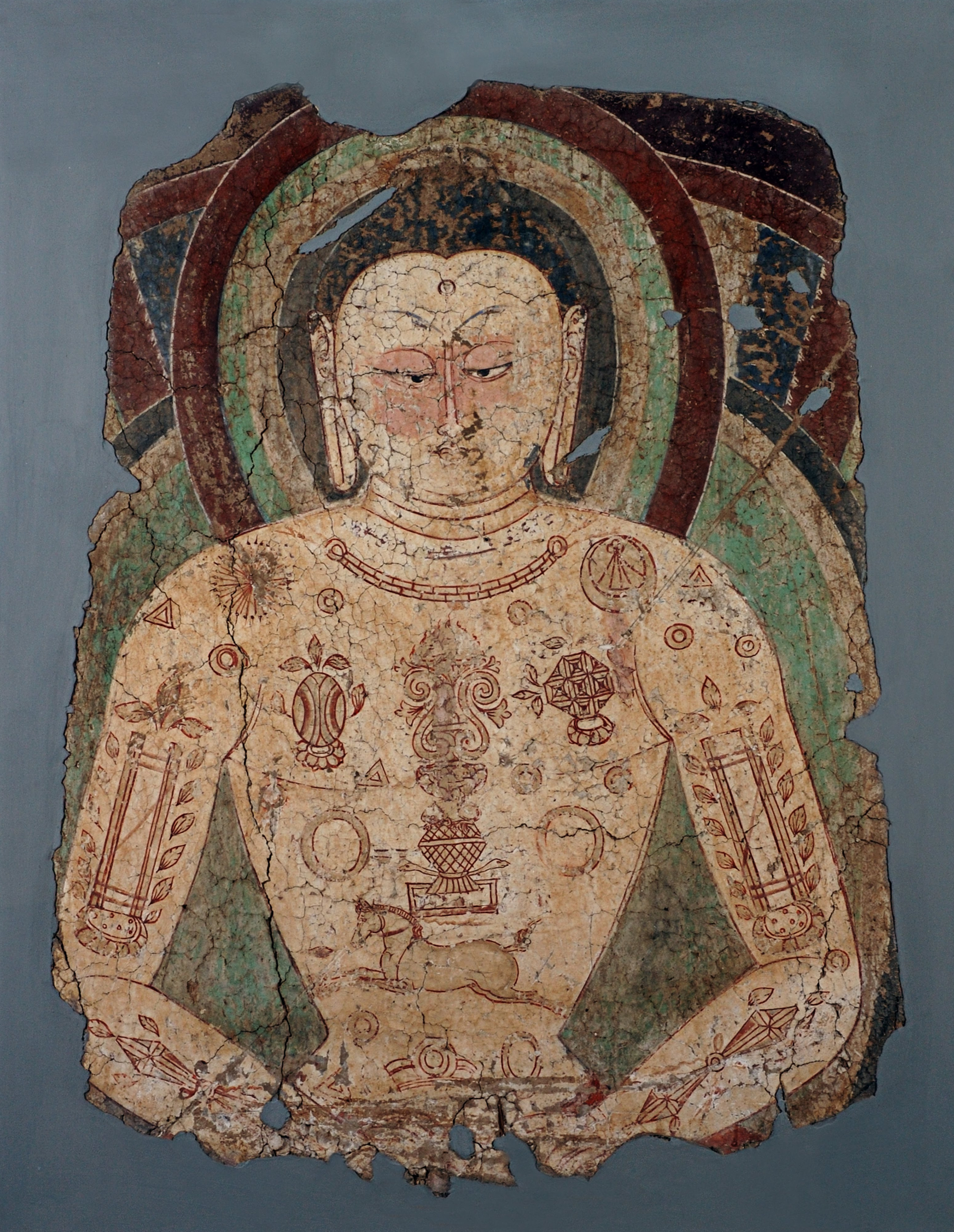
A mural of Vairocana from Balawaste, 7th—8th century.

Balawaste is a ruin site in the eastern part of the Khotan oasis, near the village of Domoko on the southern arm of the Silk Road. It was discovered by Sir Mark Aurel Stein on his first and second expeditions in 1900 and 1906 respectively. Stein found fragments of manuscripts, pottery and plaster in Balawaste, around 94 pieces found by Stein can be combined to form a sequence of life-size Buddhas, Bodhisattvas and divine beings. The site is dated to around 600AD based on the clothing style of the divine beings in the paintings found there.

== Notable Texts ==
Khotan's important location on the Silk Road was not the only draw for traveling Buddhist monks. The monasteries that existed within the kingdom were famous for their expansive libraries with translated copies of classic Mahayana texts, such as the Flower Adornment Sutra and the Golden Light Sutra. Even though the Khotanese possessed works that were entirely indigenous in origin, some of their more important collections were translated works that would have otherwise been lost to the Western World.

=== The Book of Zambasta ===
Similar to the message of the Sanghata Sutra, the Khotanese believed that all people are connected to enlightenment and that no one is estranged from the cycle of reincarnation. To reflect their own interpretations of Mahayana Buddhism, the Khotanese wrote their interpretations of Siddhartha Gautama's message through fables. This is best seen through The Book of Zambasta, a miscellany of philosophy and tales involving the Bodhisattva. The book dates from the 8th century and, while the final length of Zambasta likely exceeded 4000 lines of verse on 440 folios, only 207 folios have been found thus far. As many artifacts from the Buddhist era of Khotan have been looted from their original sites and sold in antique shops to European visitors, it is likely that pages of the manuscript have disappeared. This makes a complete translation of the book very difficult.

From what has been recovered, it is clear that the book has no singular story line, but rather comprises a vast collection of native interpretations of concepts common in Buddhist philosophy. These include, but are not limited to:

- A fable about maitrā (love)
- A cautionary tale about the world being merely a parikalpa (false assumption)
- The doctrine of śūnyatā (emptiness)
- The bodhisambhāra (equipment for enlightenment), which consists of the six pāramitās (perfections) and compassion
- The samvara (moral restraint) necessary for Bodhisattvas and the ceremony for formal undertaking of the vow to observe restraint.

The book was also famous for its sūtra-styled ("Thus I have heard...") fable about the spring. It begins with a beautiful description of spring and the effects it has on younger monks. The Buddha brings them to a cemetery, where they are reminded of the impermanence of pleasures in this life.

=== Translations of lost works ===
Similar to the Book of Zambasta, the Jatakastava chronicles the Buddha's previous lives as both human and animal. While reliving these past lives, Siddhartha Gautama looks back and talks to himself about the lessons and the characteristics he had to learn prior to becoming the Buddha. The concise nature of Khotanese texts could especially be seen here, as multiple tales are quickly told within only 26 pages. The origins of the Jatakastava caused some debate within the field of Buddhist studies. While some scholars argue that the Jatakastava was written and first published in the Kingdom of Khotan, recent evidence suggests that the Jatakastava is not an original text from Khotan, but rather a translation of an older text, presumably one written in Sanskrit. Regardless, since the Jatakastava written in its original language has been lost, the Khotanese translation is the oldest surviving manuscript.

The Sanghata Sutra was another text that was saved thanks to an early Khotanese translation that dates as early as the 5th century C.E. The sutra argues that all sentient beings are connected to enlightenment. Because everyone is connected to the goal enlightenment, one would never have to worry about being disconnected from the path of enlightenment. Since those who recite the sutra reportedly recite the exact words that the Buddha spoke during his lifetime, the person who recites the text offers his or her voice to serve as a channel by which the Buddha's presence within his teachings can spread across the world. Prior to the discovery of the Sanskrit original in 1931 the Khotanese translation was the oldest surviving manuscript of the sutra. While it was most popular within Central Asia, the sutra's influence has since expanded to become an integral part of Tibetan and Chinese Buddhism as well, as more localized and more expansive translations have been found within those societies.

== See also ==
- Index of Buddhism-related articles
- Khotan
- Kingdom of Khotan
- Tibetan Buddhism
- Rawak Stupa
- Sanghata Sutra
- Faxian
- Xuanzang
- Silk Road transmission of Buddhism
