= Christoph Baumer =

Swiss explorer and historian of Central Asia

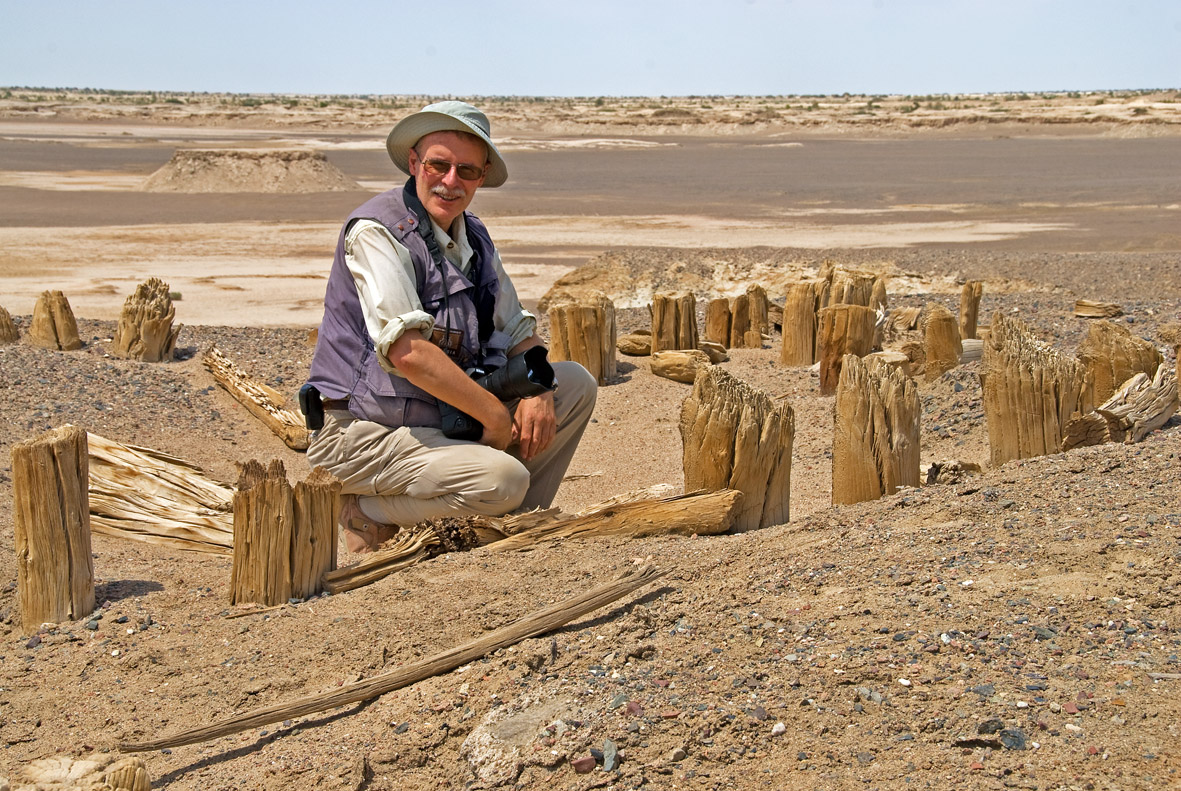
- Christoph Baumer at Bronze Age graveyard Käwrigul (Gumugou), Lop Nur, 2009
- Born: 23 June 1952 (age 74); Zurich, Switzerland

Christoph Baumer (born June 23, 1952) is a Swiss explorer and historian of Central Asia. Starting in 1984, he has conducted explorations in Central Asia, China, Tibet and the Caucasus, the results of which have been published in numerous books, scholarly publications, TV and radio programs.

== Life ==
Baumer grew up in the Swiss Canton of Thurgau. His father was a businessman; his mother had been a war correspondent for the French national press agency and reported during the Finnish-Russian war in the winter of 1939–1940. Sven Hedin, the renowned explorer of Asia, aided her return to occupied Belgium, at that time her home. As an adolescent, Baumer was already fascinated by the travel reports of Hedin, and these likely laid the foundation for Baumer's later development. After obtaining a PhD at the University of Zurich, he first worked in business until he became a freelance author and photographer with emphasis on the cultural history of Central Asia and the Caucasus. His books have been published in five languages.

Christoph Baumer is, together with Therese Weber, a Founding Member and President of the archaeological Society for the Exploration of EurAsia. The Society makes scientific contributions to the exploration of the cultures of Eurasia. It promotes archaeological fieldwork in six to eight countries and the scientific exchange of ideas and experience through publications and international conferences.

== Exploration in the Taklamakan Desert ==
In 1994, Baumer led the First Sino-Swiss Taklamakan Expedition, and was the first Westerner to reach the ancient oasis of Niya and Loulan since the 1930s.

The Second International Taklamakan Expedition followed in 1998. Christoph Baumer was the first visitor to the ancient ruined city Dandan Oilik in the Taklamakan Desert since Emil Trinkler and Walter Bosshard in 1928. The results of this expedition were, among other things, the rediscovery and excavation of unknown ruins in Dandan Oilik and Buddhist murals dating from the mid-8th century AD, the discovery of a paper document from the 7th/8th century set in the Khotanese language and Brahmi script, the discovery of a very rare stone inscription in Kharoshthi from the 3rd century AD in the ruined city Endere, and the rediscovery of a Tibetan inscription from 790. From this expedition stemmed the ZDF (Zweites Deutsches Fernsehen) TV-documentary The Lost City of Taklamakan.

In 2003, Baumer conducted the Third International Taklamakan Expedition in collaboration with the Archaeological Institute of Ürümqi, Xinjiang and a representative of the University of London, during which he made finds north of Qiemo from the Neolithic Age (4th–3rd millennium BC).

In 2007, he led the Fourth International Taklamakan Expedition into unexplored regions of the Lop Nor Desert. There he discovered, among other things, a previously unknown settlement, dating from approximately 100 BC–400 AD.

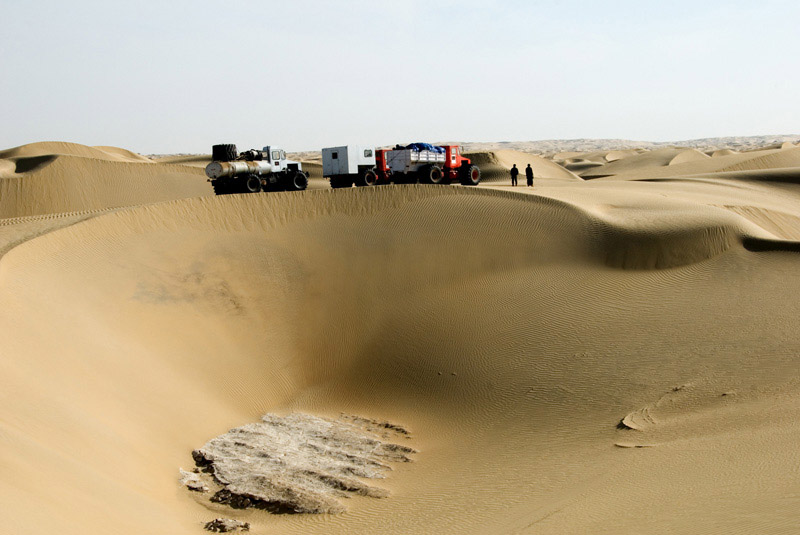
In the Lop Nor Desert, 2007

In 2009, he led the Fifth International Taklamakan Expedition into the unexplored ancient delta of the River Keriya in the centre of the desert, and discovered two unknown graveyards: Satma Mazar (Iron Age) and Ayala Mazar (Bronze Age).

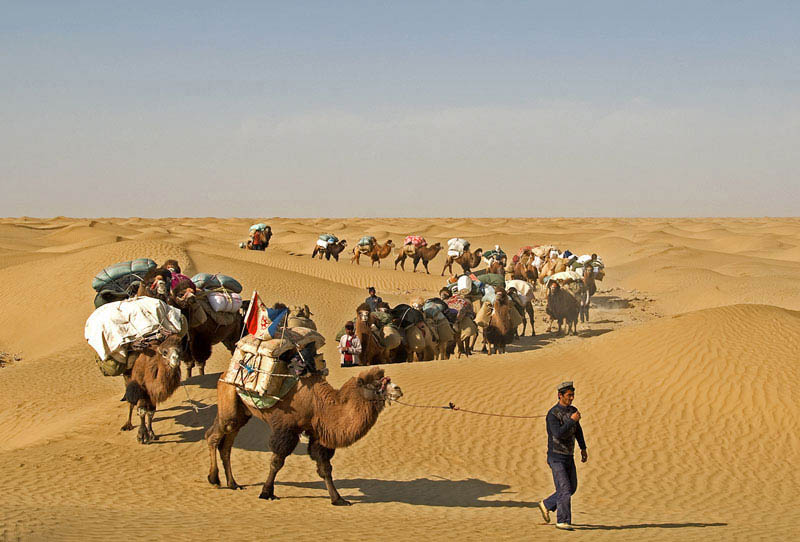
The Fifth Taklamakan Expedition in the fossil delta of the River Keriya, 2009

== Other explorations ==
Further expeditions took Baumer to southern Tibet in 1996, where he rediscovered in the former monastery Sekar Guthok forgotten murals from the 13th century; and in 1997 again to southern Tibet, where he discovered in the Pa-Lha-Puk Monastery the oldest existing murals of the Bön religion – from the early 15th century – in all of Tibet.

In the years 2000 to 2005 he researched and documented most of the relevant cultural monuments of the Assyrian Church of the East, from southeastern Turkey to Mongolia, China and southern India.

In the years 1993, 2006 and 2007 he visited and documented all the Buddhist monasteries of Mount Wutai Shan, in northwestern China.

From 2013 to 2019 he explored on six journeys the Caucasus region in view of a forthcoming publication on the history of the Caucasus.

== Bibliography ==
- Tibet's Ancient Religion: Bön, Weatherhill and Orchid Press, 2002. ISBN 974-524-011-7 (Asia & Europe), ISBN 0-8348-0517-0 (Americas)
- Southern Silk Road: In the Footsteps of Sir Aurel Stein and Sven Hedin, 2nd revised edition, Orchid Press, 2004. 974-8304-39-6 (Paperback) ISBN 974-8304-38-8 (Hardback)
- The Church of the East: An Illustrated History of Assyrian Christianity, I.B. Tauris, London, 2006, revised 2016. ISBN 1-84511-115-X
- Traces in the Desert: Journeys of Discovery across Central Asia, I.B.Tauris, London, 2008. ISBN 978-1-84511-337-7
- China's Holy Mountain: An Illustrated Journey into the Heart of Buddhism, I.B. Tauris, London, 2011. ISBN 978-1-84885-700-1
- The History of Central Asia (Volume One): The Age of the Steppe Warriors, I.B. Tauris, London, 2012. ISBN 978-1-78076-832-8
- The History of Central Asia (Volume Two): The Age of the Silk Roads, I.B. Tauris, London 2014. ISBN 978-1-78076-832-8
- The History of Central Asia (Volume Three): The Age of Islam and the Mongols, I.B. Tauris, London, 2016. ISBN 978-1-78453-490-5
- The History of Central Asia (Volume Four): The Age of Decline and Revival, I.B. Tauris, London, 2018. ISBN 978-1-78831-049-9
- History of the Caucasus (Volume One): At the Crossroads of Empires, I.B. Tauris/Bloomsbury, London, 2021. ISBN 978-1-78831-007-9
- History of the Caucasus (Volume Two): In the Shadow of Great Powers, I.B. Tauris/Bloomsbury, London, 2023. ISBN 978-0-75563-628-0
- Co-author with Therese Weber: Eastern Tibet: Bridging Tibet and China, Orchid Press, 2005. ISBN 974-524-064-8
- Co-editor with Mirko Novák: Urban Cultures of Central Asia from the Bronze Age to the Karakhanids, Harrassowitz, Wiesbaden, 2019. ISBN 978-3-447-11169-0
- Co-editor with Mirko Novák and Susanne Rutishauser: Cultures in Contact Central Asia as Focus of Trade, Cultural Exchange and Knowledge Transmission, Harrassowitz, Wiesbaden, 2022. ISBN 978-3-447-11880-4
