= Dandan Oilik =

Abandoned historic town and Buddhist site in China

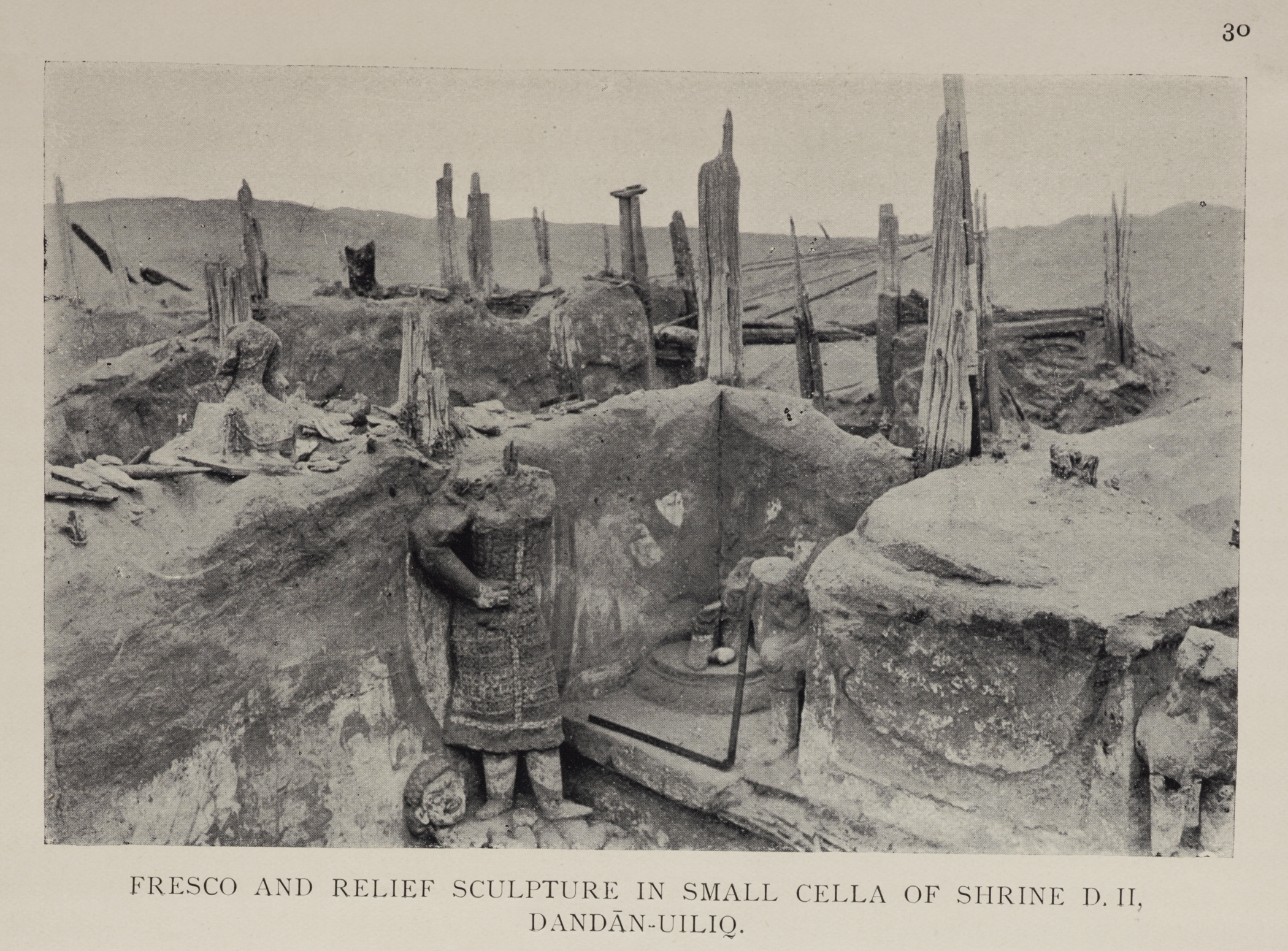
- Ruins of Buddhist shrine in Dandan-Uiliq

- Location within China
- 37°46′28″N 81°4′23″E
- Location: China
- Region: northern Qira County, Hotan Prefecture, Xinjiang

Dandan Oilik (simplified Chinese: 丹丹乌里克; traditional Chinese: 丹丹烏里克; pinyin: Dāndānwūlǐkè; Uyghur: دەندان ئۆيلىك), also Dandān-Uiliq, lit. "the houses with ivory", is an abandoned historic oasis town and Buddhist site in the Taklamakan Desert of China, located to the northeast of Khotan in what is now the autonomous region of Xinjiang, between the Khotan and Keriya rivers. The central site covers an area of 4.5 km^{2}; the greater oasis extends over an area of 22 km^{2}. The site flourished from the sixth century as a site along the southern branch of the Silk Road until its abandonment before the Tibetan advance at the end of the eighth century.

Dandan Oilik was rediscovered and partially excavated by a succession of foreign explorers starting in 1896, and has yielded rich finds including manuscripts, stucco reliefs, painted wooden panels, and murals. A detailed survey was conducted in 2006 although much of the site remains unexcavated. Dandan Oilik is currently off-limits to the public.

== Rediscovery ==
After over a millennium of abandonment to the shifting sands, Dandan Oilik was rediscovered in 1896 by Swedish explorer Sven Hedin. Leaving his baggage in Khotan, Hedin set out on 14 January 1896 with a retinue of four men, three camels, and two donkeys, along with enough provisions to last fifty days. After five days the party left the White Jade River, heading east between the dunes, which gradually increased to a height of fifty feet. Steering through the davans or "passes" between the dunes, with live tamarisk or poplar indicating sources of water, ten days after departing Khotan Hedin rode his camel bareback to the "Buried City of Taklamakan".

There he found traces of hundreds of wooden houses; a "Temple of Buddha", with walls constructed of bundles of reeds fixed to stakes, and covered in earthen plaster and wall paintings – of kneeling females, moustachioed males in Persian clothing, animals, and boats rocking in the waves; fragments of paper with indecipherable characters; a life-size gypsum foot; and a series of Buddha images. Most of the ruins, extending over an area two to two and a half miles across, were buried under high dunes. Hedin found that excavation was "desperate work", with the sand immediately filling whatever was dug, necessitating the removal of entire dunes; furthermore, and despite their antiquity, the camels and donkeys still "consumed with relish" the reeds once used in construction. Although unable to recover the overall plan of the city, Hedin found traces of gardens, rows of poplars indicating ancient avenues, and remains of ancient apricot and plum trees, concluding that "the walls of this God-accursed city, this second Sodom in the desert, had thus in ancient times been washed by a powerful stream – the Keriya-daria".

Who could have imagined, that in the interior of the dread Desert of Gobi ... actual cities slumbered under the sand ... and yet there stood I amid the wreck and devastation of an ancient people, within whose dwellings none had ever entered save the sandstorm in its days of maddest revelry; there stood I like the prince in the enchanted wood, having awakened to new life the city which had slumbered for a thousand years, or at any rate rescued the memory of its existence from oblivion.

== Aurel Stein ==
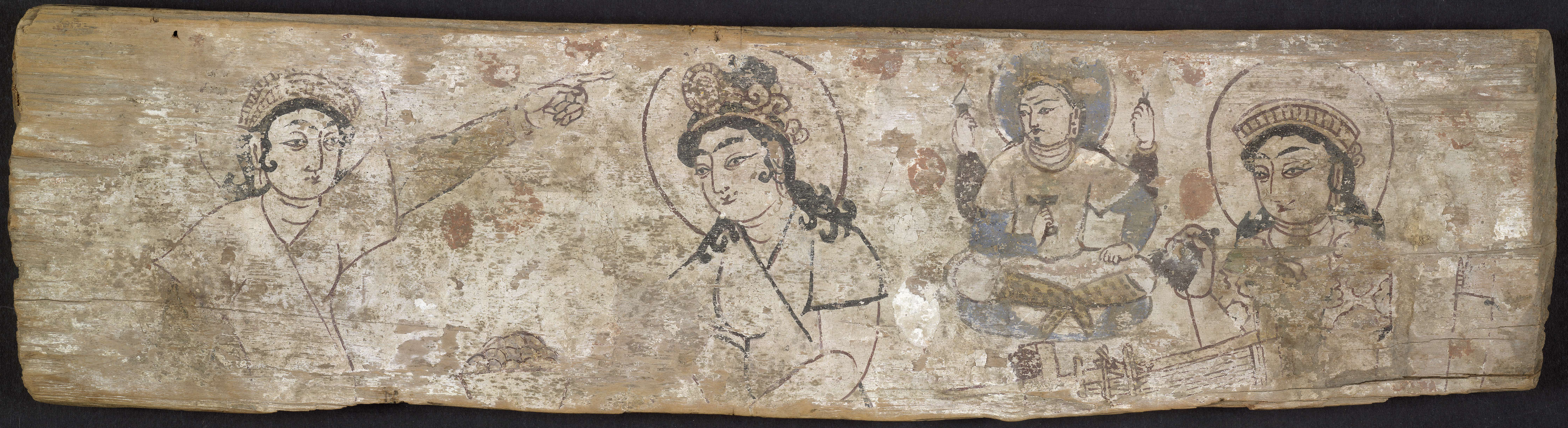
Painting on wooden panel discovered by Aurel Stein in Dandan Oilik, depicting the legend of the princess who hid silkworm eggs in her headdress to smuggle them out of China to the Kingdom of Khotan.

In December 1900, alerted in Khotan by a "reliable 'treasure-seeker'" who brought fragments of wall painting with Brahmi script, stucco reliefs, and paper documents from a site known locally as Dandān-Uiliq- Aurel Stein set off in the footsteps of Hedin- accompanied by two of his guides and a team of thirty labourers, to begin excavations. He uncovered a series of structures (labelled by Stein D. I to D. XVII), including dwellings and a number of Buddhist shrines. D. II has a central rectangular platform surmounted by a moulded lotus statue base, on which only the foot of the image survives; the surrounding passage Stein identified as serving for parikrama (ritual circumambulation). In an adjoining smaller building was a headless Buddha which Stein carted off on a mule and is now in the British Museum; another headless figure, clad in mail, wearing wide boots similar to the soft leather chāruks of contemporary Turkestan, trampling another figure, and thought to represent Kubera; and wall paintings of a seated monastic, a Buddha, horsemen, and a nude dancing girl in a pool of water against a backdrop of flowering lotus, adorned with jewels and a strategically placed vine leaf.

Among the documents discovered, written in a variety of scripts on paper, wooden tablets, and sticks, were Buddhist texts; a petition for the recovery of a donkey after the failure of its two purchasers to pay even ten months later; a petition for exemption from requisitions of grain and forced labour after visitation by bandits; a request for the military of skins for drums and quail feathers for arrows; records of loans; and an important early Judeo-Persian document edited and dated to 718 by David Samuel Margoliouth seemingly concerned predominantly with the sale of sheep, complaints of unfair treatment, and the teaching of a girl. Aurel Stein translated the document into English.

== Later expeditions ==
In 1905, geographer Ellsworth Huntington visited Dandan Oilik and observed that it was once watered by a river that no longer flows through the area. From 1928 and the visit of Emil Trinkler and Walter Bosshard, the site lay untouched for nearly seventy years until an initial inspection in 1996 by the Xinjiang Archaeological Institute. In 1998, Christoph Baumer led an expedition to the site, making further discoveries.

In 2002, a joint expedition by teams from the Xinjiang Cultural Relics Bureau, the Xinjiang Archaeological Research Institute, and Niya Research Institute of Bukkyo University in Japan discovered a new Buddhist temple with wall paintings. This was subsequently excavated and thirty sections of the paintings were detached and removed to Ürümqi. They include seated Buddhas, serial figures in the Thousand Buddha tradition, bodhisattvas, horsemen on dappled mounts and an inscription in the Saka language, one of the Iranian languages. In 2006, in recognition of its significance, Dandan Oilik was listed by the National Cultural Heritage Administration as a national priority protected site.

== Gallery ==
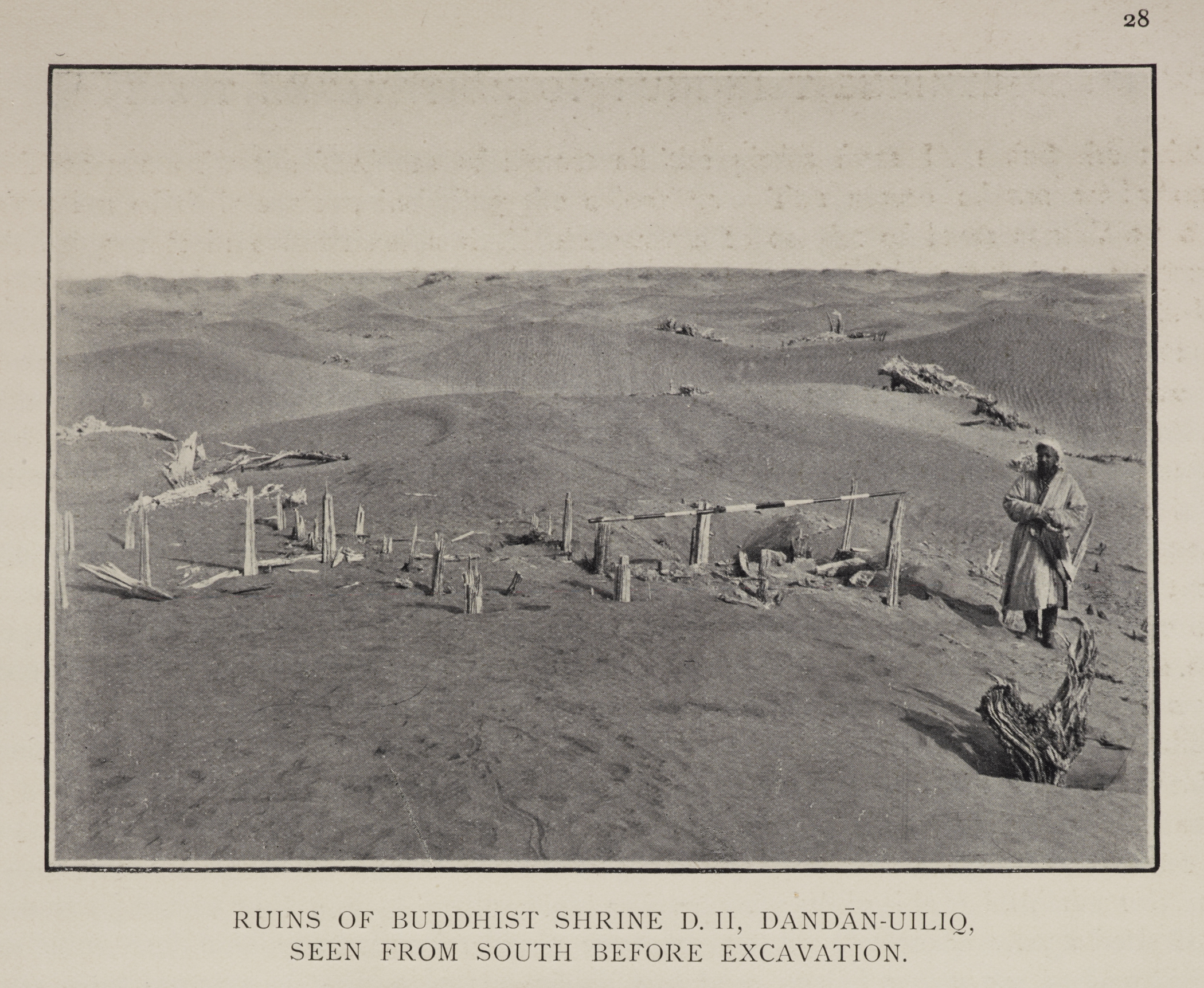
Ancient Khotan BLER2 AKV1 FP246 FIG28

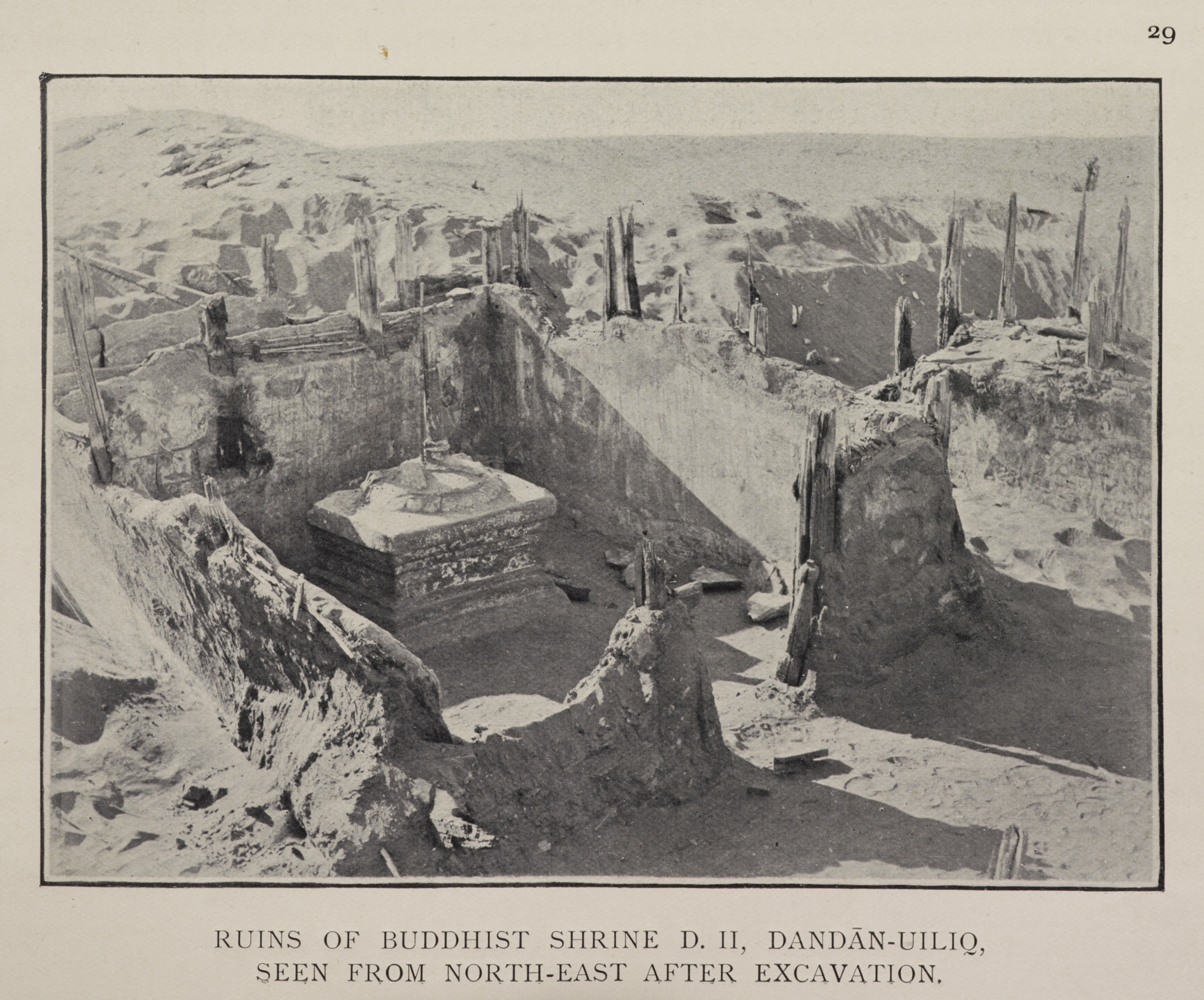
Ancient Khotan BLER2 AKV1 FP246 FIG29

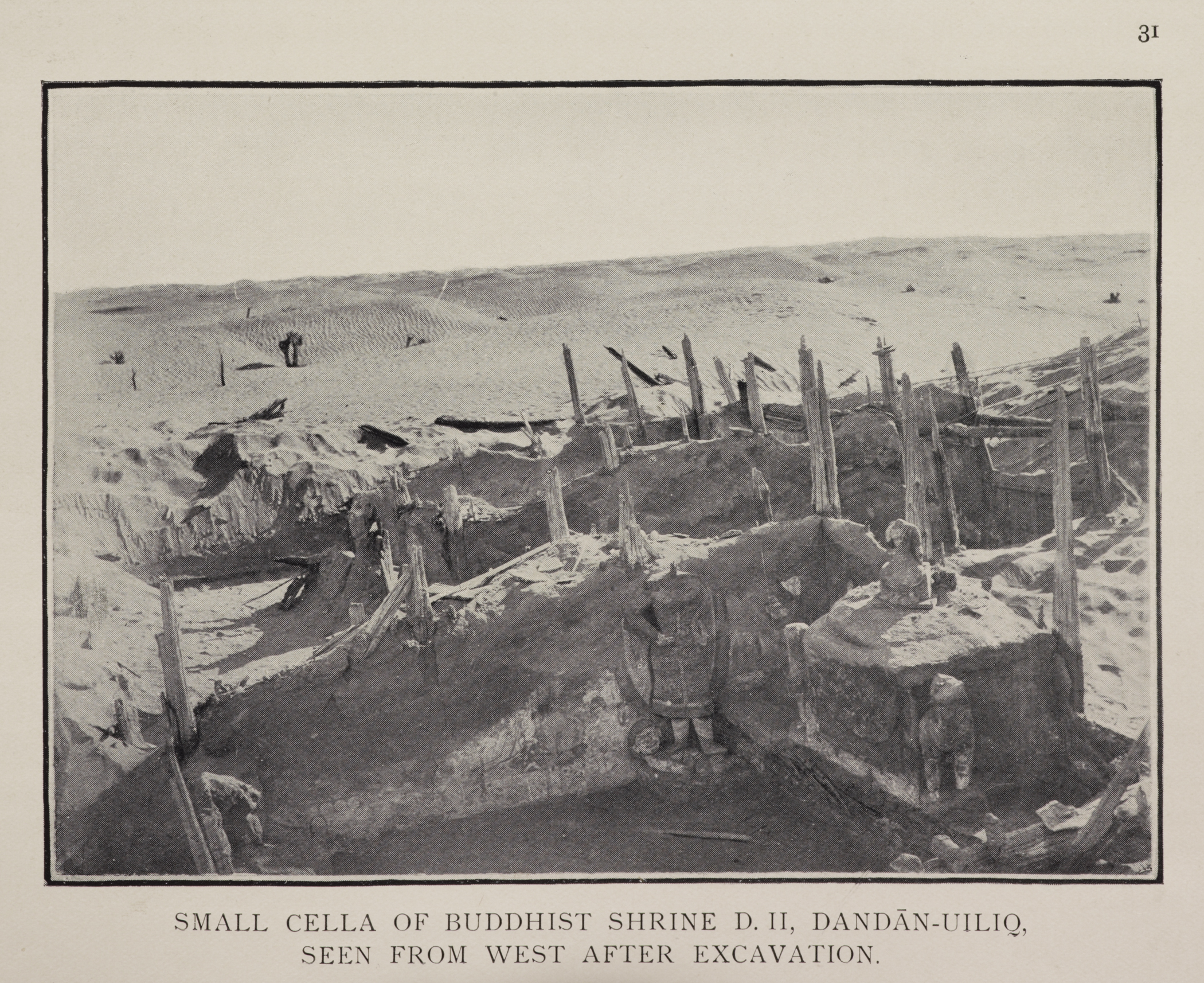
Ancient Khotan BLER2 AKV1 FP246 FIG31

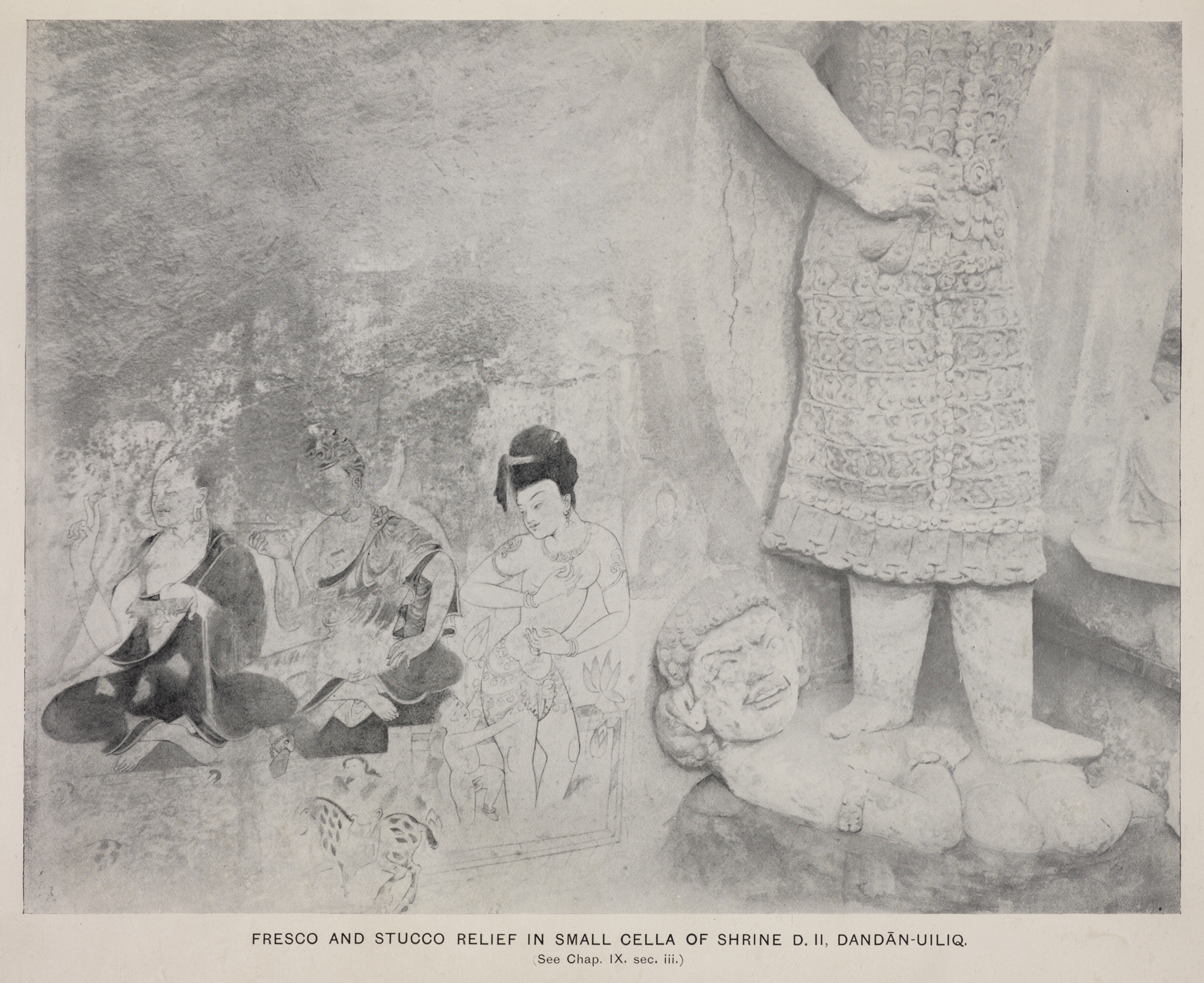
Ancient Khotan BLER4 AKV2 PLII PHOT

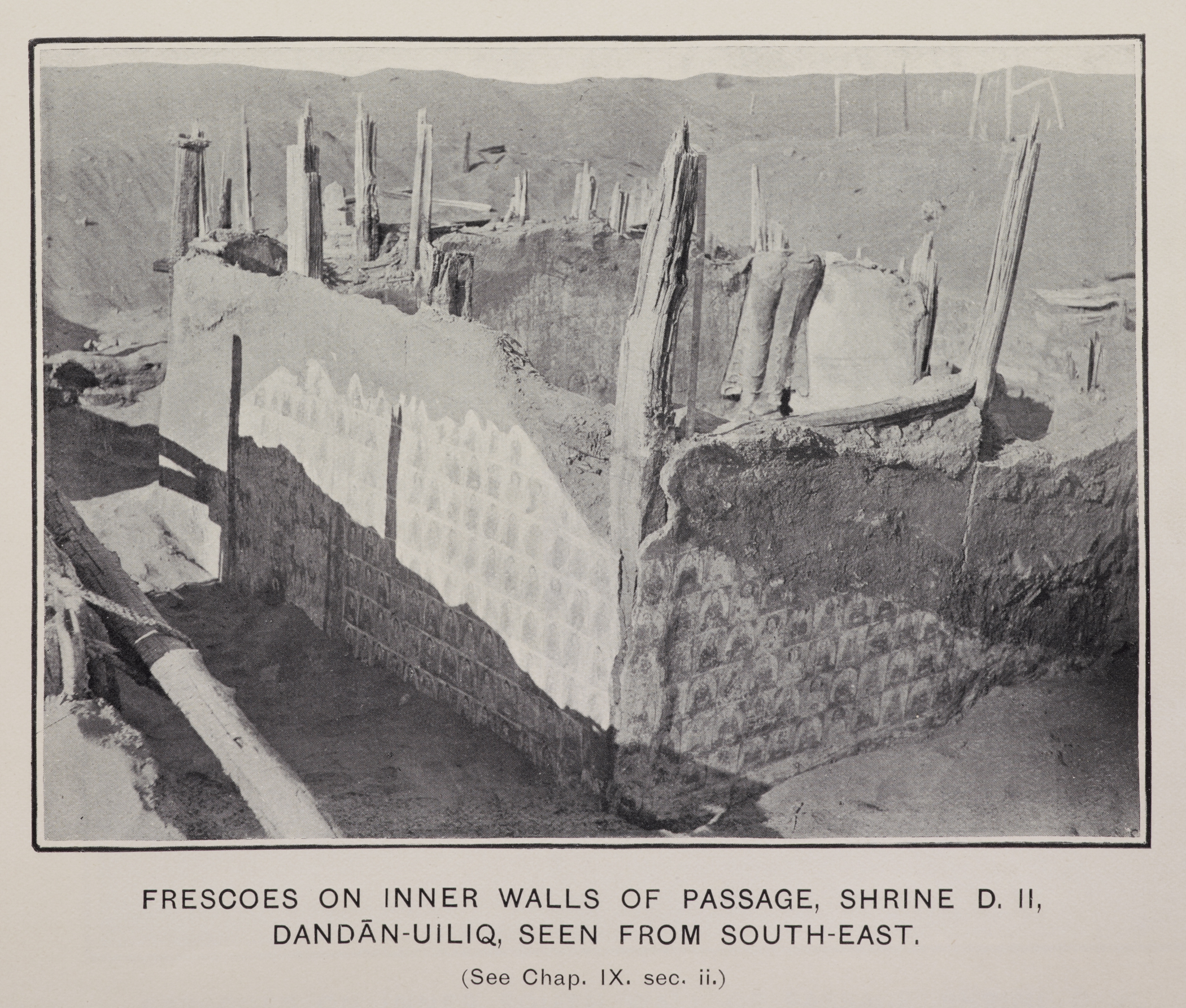
Ancient Khotan BLER4 AKV2 PLIII PHOTB

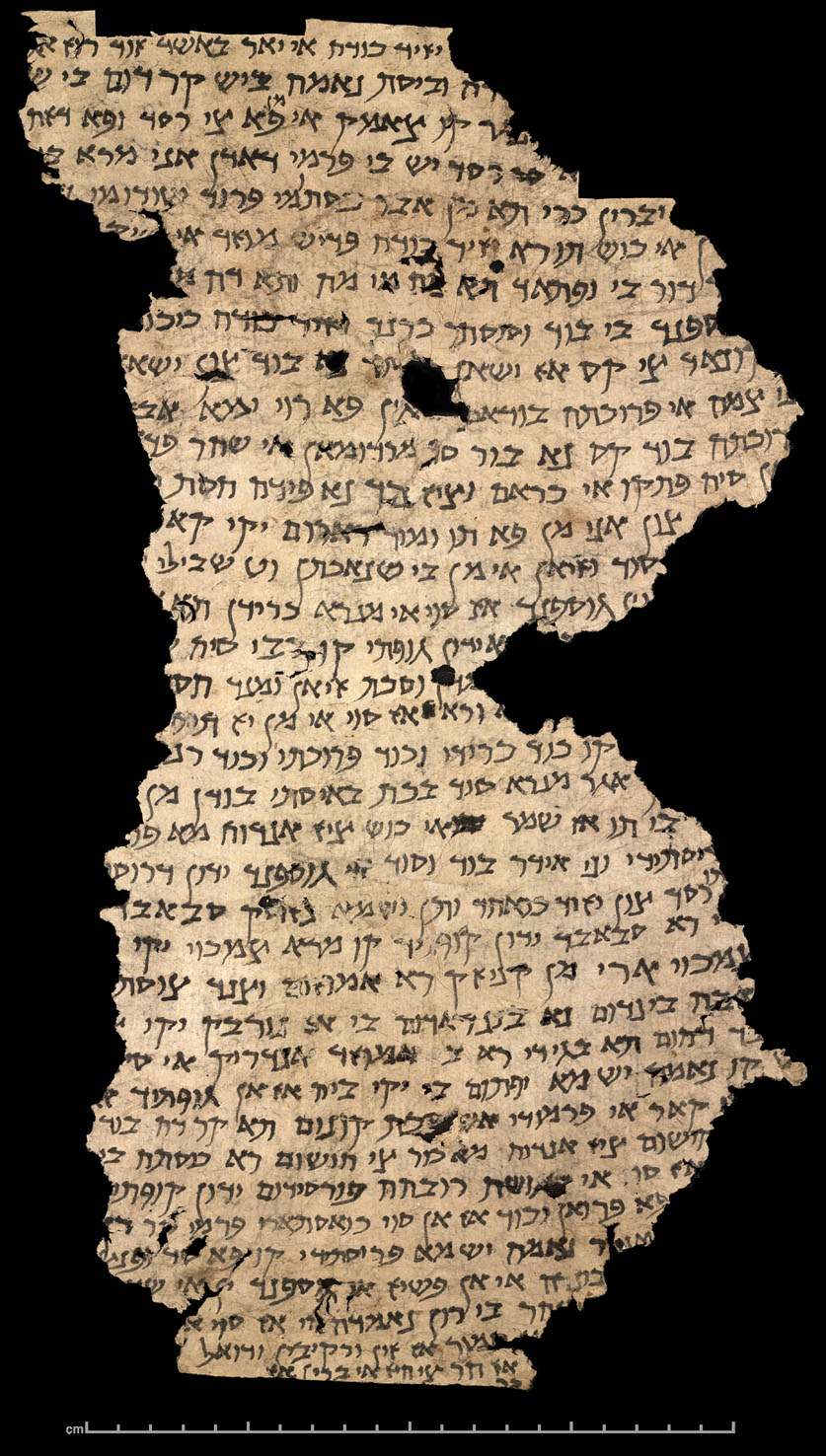
Judeo-Persian letter BLI7 OR8212166R1 1

== See also ==
- Kingdom of Khotan
- Loulan Kingdom
- Niya
- Xiaohe Tomb complex
- Major national historical and cultural sites (Xinjiang)
- List of archaeological sites of the Taklamakan and Lop Desert
