= Endere =

Archaeological site in Xinjiang, China

Coordinates: 37°36′N 83°48′E

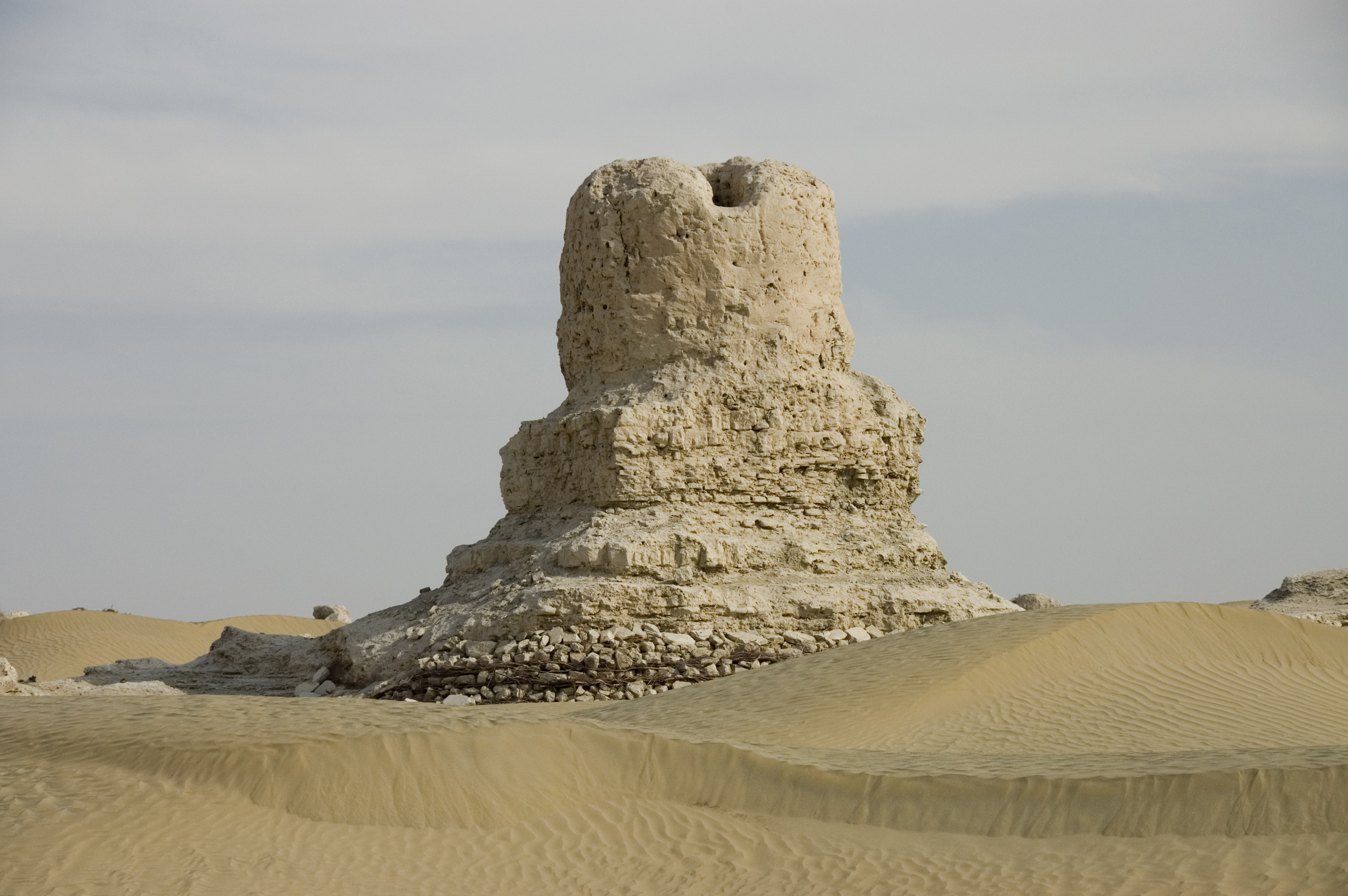
Endere Stupa

Endere (Chinese: 安迪尔; pinyin: Āndí'ěr) is an archaeological site in Xinjiang, China, in the southern Taklamakan Desert, a part of the southern route of the ancient Silk Road. It has been tentatively identified with a place called Saca that is mentioned in documents written in Kharoṣṭhī script which have been found in the region.

== Archaeological excavations ==
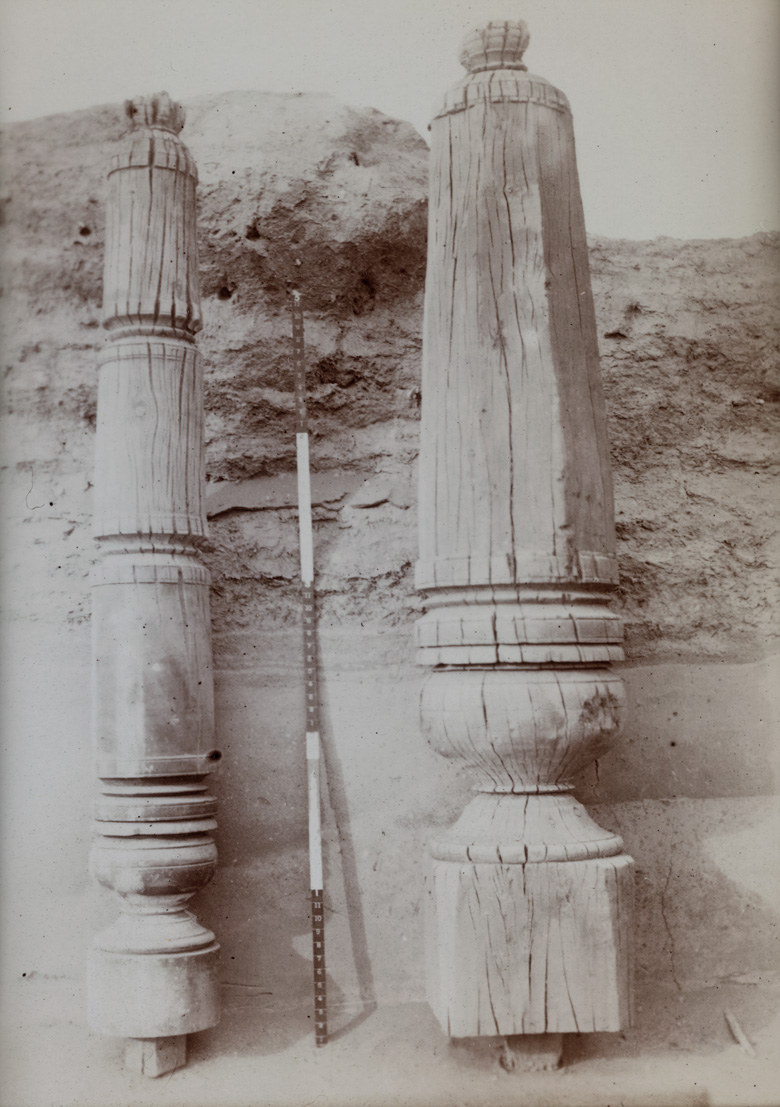
Pillars excavated in Endere

In 1901 the fort of Endere was excavated by Sir Mark Aurel Stein. Endere is believed to have been an important military post and a centre for Buddhist worship located about half-way between Charchan and Nina (or Niya). Coins discovered there indicate that the Chinese controlled the area as early as the Han dynasty but fell to the Tibetans during the Tang dynasty. However, the fort was abandoned in the ninth century when the Endere river changed its course.

Stein discovered a number of buildings devoted to Buddhist worship including a shrine filled with textile rags and fragments of Buddhist manuscripts written in Chinese, Tibetan and Sanskrit which suggests it had drawn worshippers from far and wide.
