= Akṣayamatinirdeśa Sūtra =

Important Mahāyāna Sutra

The Akṣayamatinirdeśa (Skt, Exposition of Akṣayamati, Tibetan: Blo gros mi zad pas bstan pa; Chinese: Wujinyi pusa pin / Achamo pusa jing, 無盡意菩薩品 / 阿差末菩薩經) is a Mahāyāna sūtra which teaches the doctrine of imperishability (akṣayatā) and the eighty different aspects of the Dharma which are imperishable (which constitute the whole bodhisattva path). According to Jens Braarvig, the sutra may have reached a definite form sometime in the second century CE.

The Akṣayamatinirdeśa is a part of the Mahāsannipāta Collection of Mahāyāna sutras and it is closely related to the Bodhisattvapiṭaka sutra. Ulrich Pagel writes that "the Akṣayamatinirdeśa is greatly indebted to the Bodhisattvapiṭaka for its material, often to the extent of reproducing entire passages from the Bodhisattvapiṭaka verbatim."

The Sanskrit text was translated into Chinese five times (only two of these survive), and also exists in a Tibetan translation. An English translation from the Tibetan and study of the text has been completed by Jens Braarvig and a full translation is available online on 84000.co. A reconstruction of the Sanskrit text also exists.

== Teaching ==
The main teachings of the Akṣayamatinirdeśa is the imperishability or inexhaustibility (akṣayatā) of reality, as well as the bodhisattva practices and also the unity of different ideas (such as prajñā or insight and skillful means or upaya).

Imperishability refers to the fact that all phenomena are empty (śunya), and while they appear ever perishing (kṣaya) they are unborn (anutpanna) and illusory (maya). Since the perishing or cessation of phenomena is ultimately an illusion and a mere thought construction (vikalpa), and since all dharmas are always empty and illusory, they are described as imperishable (akṣaya), because what does not truly arise (anutpāda) does not really perish.

This concept is also described in a more positive manner, taken to be a description of the everlasting qualities of the Buddhas and bodhisattvas (especially prajñāpāramitā) as well as the everlasting presence of the Buddha vis a vis Mahāyāna concepts such as Suchness (tathātā), and the Dharma-body (dharmakāya). Furthermore, these ideas are connected to the Mahāyāna idea that the Dharmadhatu (the totality of existence) is without limits, empty, without beginning, imperishable and will never cease. Since the Dharmadhatu is the Dharma-body of the Buddha (because all Buddhas are born from this reality), the activity of the Buddhas (and bodhisattvas) will never cease and is imperishable. Hence, the Akṣayamatinirdeśa claims that because of the empty, imperishable and endless nature of the totality of existence (and of living beings), the activities of the Buddhas and bodhisattvas are equally imperishable (since they work endlessly to help all beings out of great compassion and will never abandon them).

The main body of the Akṣayamatinirdeśa explains eighty bodhisattva qualities which are called "imperishables" (akṣayas), including the thought of awakening (bodhicitta), the perfections (pāramitā), the super-knowledges (abhijñā) and the practices conducing to enlightenment (bodhipākṣika-dharma).

Another important theme of this sutra is the unification or integration (yuganaddha) of seemingly opposite or different qualities, especially the union of wisdom (prajñā) and skillful means (upāya) – i.e. prajñopāyayuganaddha. This is how the bodhisattva cultivates wisdom without entering nirvana while remaining in samsara to help all beings through endless teaching devices. The philosophical basis of this unity is the fact that reality is non-dual, since it is all equally empty. Hence the highest bodhisattva activities are those which are practiced with an understanding that transcends duality (such as the dualities of self and other, existence and non-existence and samsara and nirvana).

== Influence ==
The Akṣayamatinirdeśa was an influential sutra in India and many passages from this sutra were cited by scholars of both the madhyamaka and the yogachara school. According to Jens Braarvig, "the eighty so-called “imperishabilities” (akṣaya) described in the sūtra‍—qualities to be possessed by the bodhisatvas‍—were considered to contain the whole way of religious development of the Mahāyāna, and many passages became loci classici employed by the scholars of the Mahāyāna to elucidate their doctrines or to defend certain positions with authoritative sayings."

Braarvig also notes that the Akṣayamatinirdeśa shows some similarities with the Vimalakīrtinirdeśa, particularly in their exposition on imperishability and thus it may have influenced the Vimalakīrtinirdeśa.

A yogacara commentary on this sutra, the Akṣayamatinirdeśa-ṭīkā (Derge Tanjur, Toh. 3994), was written in India and is attributed to Vasubandhu, but may have been written by Sthiramati or another later yogacara school figure.

The Akṣayamatinirdeśa is particularly important as a source for Buddhist Hermeneutics and it was cited by madhyamaka authors as a source for their definition of definitive (nītārtha) and implicit (neyārtha) meanings since the Akṣayamatinirdeśa states that the definitive sūtras are those which teach emptiness (śūnyatā), the absence of distinguishing marks (ānimitta), and the absence of anything to long for (apraṇidhāna)‍. According to the influential Tibetan author Tsongkhapa, the main hermeneutical principle of the madhyamaka school is based on the Akṣayamatinirdeśa, which states that the sutras that teach emptiness are those which are definitive. The yogacaras also held the sutra in high esteem and cited as a major source for the bodhisattva path.

== See also ==
- Mahasamnipata Sutra
- Vimalakirti Sutra
- Prajñaparamita

== Sources ==
- Braarvig, Jens. (1993). Akṣayamatinirdeśasūtra, vol. I: Edition of extant manuscripts with an index, Oslo: Solum forlag; pdf.
- Braarvig, Jens. (1993). Akṣayamatinirdeśasūtra, vol. II: The Tradition of Imperishability in Buddhist Thought, translation with introduction, Oslo: Solum forlad; pdf.
- Buswell Jr., Robert E.; Lopez Jr., Donald S. (2013). The Princeton Dictionary of Buddhism, pp. 27. Princeton University Press.
- Pagel, Ulrich (1994). The Bodhisattvapiṭaka and Akṣayamatinirdeśa: Continuity and Change in Buddhist Sūtras. The Buddhist Forum Volume v.3 Pages 333 - 373.
