= Balawaste =

Coordinates: 37.05°N 81.083°E

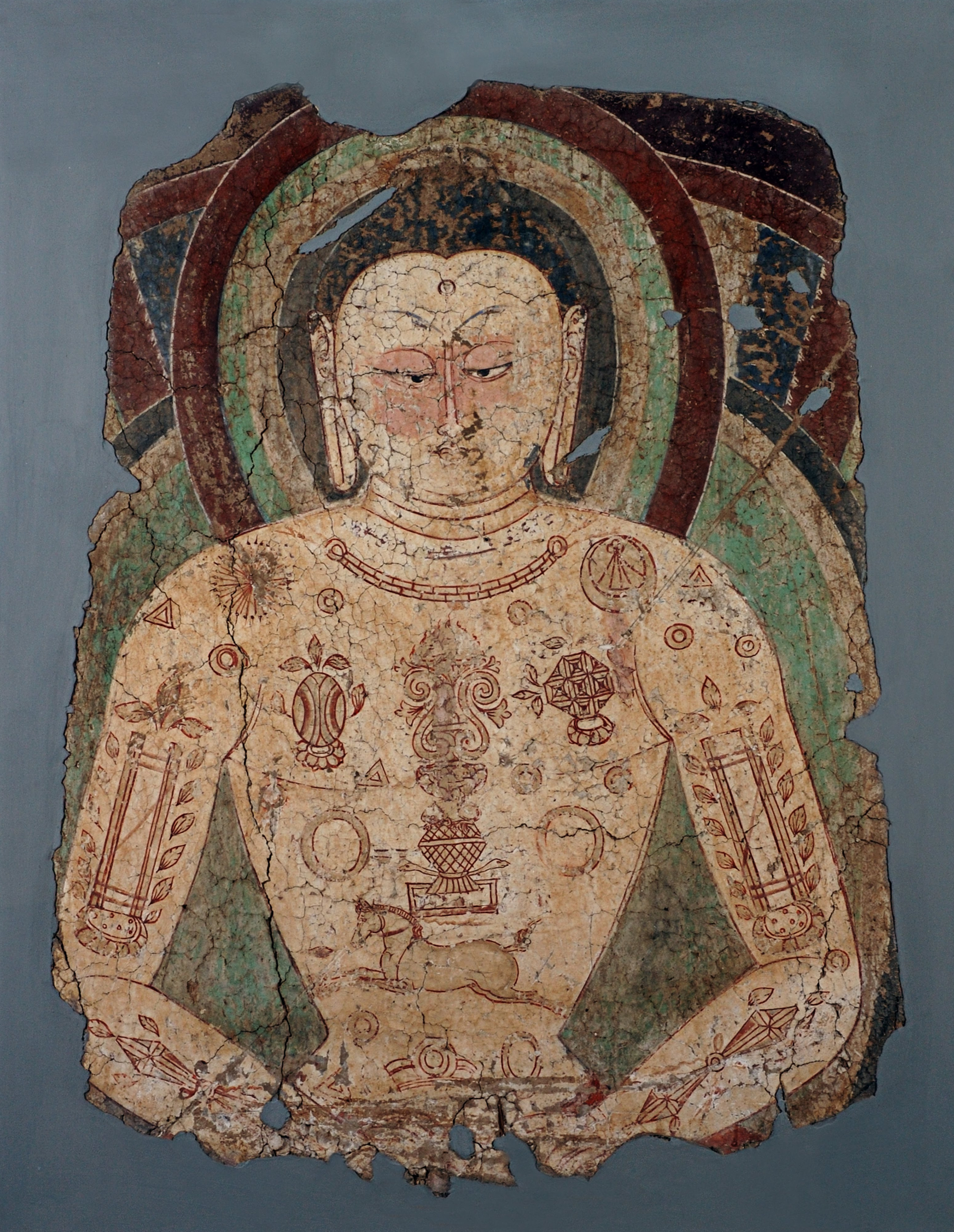
A mural of Vairocana from Balawaste, 7th—8th century.

Balawaste (بلوسته) is an archaeological site in the eastern part of the Khotan oasis, near the village of Domoko on the southern arm of the Silk Road. It included a small room, an animal pen and a Buddhist shrine.

It was excavated by Sir Mark Aurel Stein on his second Central Asian expedition (1906-8). Stein found pieces of stucco relief from a Buddhist statue and textiles. One of his local guides identified this site as the place he had earlier found woodslip manuscripts in Chinese and Brahmi script that had been sold to Stein at Khotan by Badruddin Khan.

In 1915, while in Khotan on his third Central Asian expedition (1913-6), Stein was sold further pieces, both stucco fragments and manuscripts, by Badhurddin Khan also purportedly from Balawaste. He had no means of verifying this but believed the style was consistent with this provenance. Around 94 pieces found by Stein can be combined to form a sequence of life-size Buddhas, Bodhisattvas, and divine beings.

Stein dated the site to around 600 AD based on the clothing style of the Buddhist figures.
