= Akṣayamati =

Bodhisattva

- Sanskrit: अक्षयमति Akṣayamati
- Chinese: (Traditional) 無盡意菩薩 (Simplified) 无尽意菩萨 (Pinyin: Wújìnyì Púsà)
- Japanese: 無盡意菩薩(むじんいぼさつ) (romaji: Mujin'i Bosatsu)
- Khmer: អក្សយមតី (asa-yama-tei)
- Korean: 무진의보살 (RR: Mujin-ui Bosal)
- Tibetan: བློ་གྲོས་མི་ཟད་པ་ Wylie: blo gros mi zad pa
- Vietnamese: Vô Tận Ý Bồ Tát

Information
- Venerated by: Mahāyāna: (Lotus Sutra); (Akṣayamatinirdeśa Sūtra); (Consecration Sutra (灌頂經)); (Mañjuśrīparipṛcchā Sūtra); (Buddhadhātu Śāstra); Vajrayāna

Akṣayamati (Sanskrit: अक्षयमति; also called Inexhaustible Awareness) is a bodhisattva who appears in the Lotus Sutra and the Akṣayamatinirdeśa Sūtra within the larger Mahāvaipulya Mahāsamghāta Sūtra.

He is recognized as one of the sixteen bodhisattvas of the auspicious aeon (bhadrakalpa). He also has the ability to perceive and understand all actions of cause and effect (Skt. aparuṣā).

== Lotus Sutra ==
In Chapter 25 of the Lotus Sutra, Akṣayamati asks Shakyamuni Buddha to elaborate on the character of the bodhisattva Avalokiteśvara.

After receiving a detailed explanation on the Bodhisattva's wanderings throughout the world, Akṣayamati offers Avalokiteśvara a pearl necklace of great value. Avalokiteśvara refuses at first, but Akṣayamati entreats him to accept it for the Dharma, out of compassion. Avalokiteśvara finally accepts the necklace out of compassion for the fourfold assembly, devas, nāgas, yakshas, gandharvas, asuras, garudas, kinnaras, mahoragas, humans, non-humans, etc.

== Sources ==
- "無盡意". Digital Dictionary of Buddhism. 2015.
- "The White Lotus of the Good Dharma". 84000.
