= Farhad-beg-yailaki =

Silk Road archaeological site near Hotan, China

Coordinates: 37.196°N 81.065°E

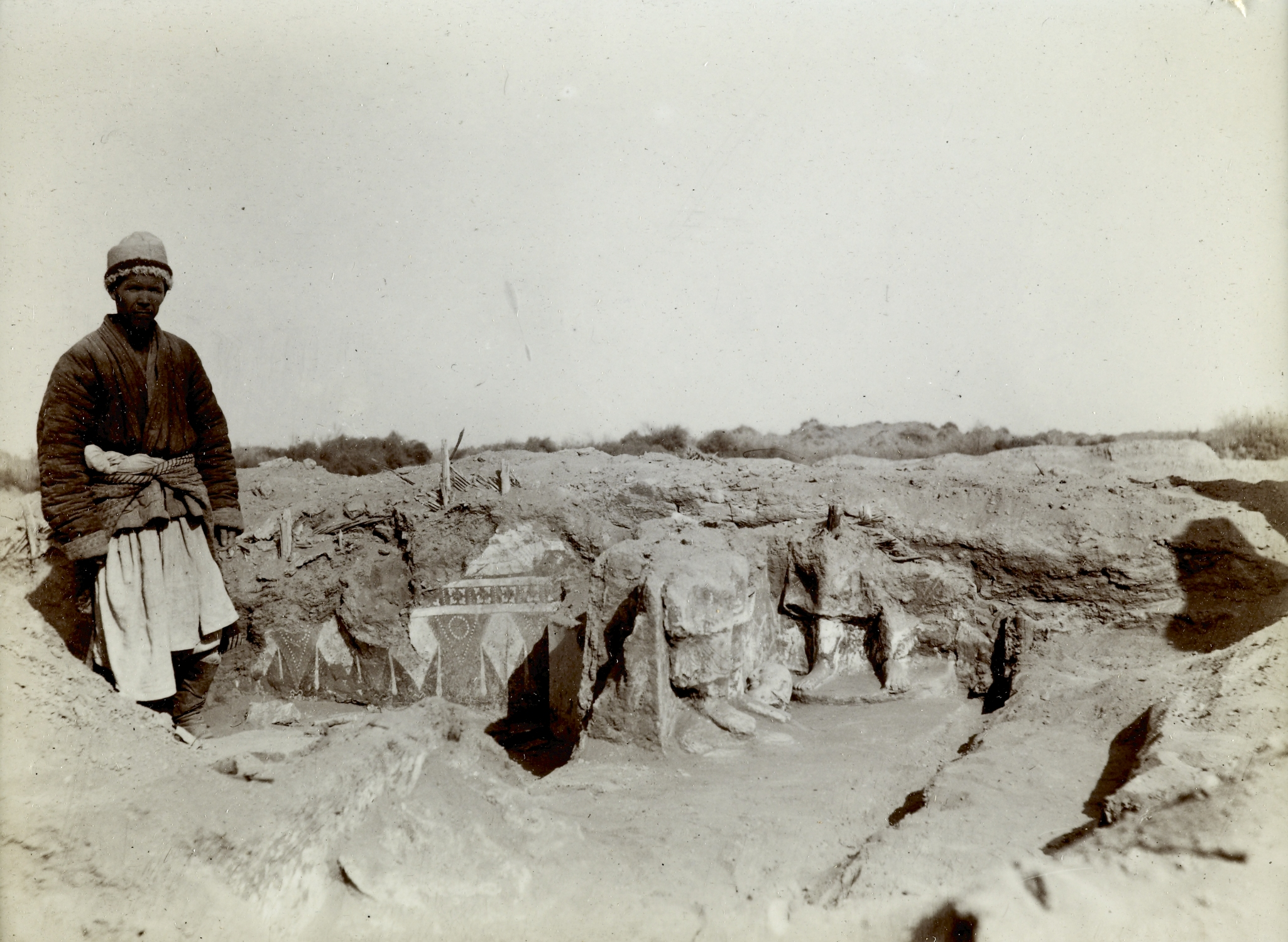
Aurél Stein photo of the Farhad-beg-yailaki site, seen from southwest in 1906–08. Remains of the ruined temple and porch

Farhad-beg-yailaki is an archaeological site on the Silk Road in what was the Kingdom of Khotan which is located 60 miles east of its affiliated city, Hotan, China.

== Rediscovery ==
Sir Marc Aurel Stein, a Hungarian-born early British archaeologists and explorer, investigated the remains of numerous centers of Buddhism during the early 1900s through three expeditions to the Silk Road. One of the sites Stein uncovered was the Buddhist shrines at Farhad-beg-yailaki, dated to around the fourth to sixth century AD.

== Buddhist imagery ==
Several Buddhist statues found within the shines are wearing robes covered in bright floral designs with a mound of fabric at their feet, which are thought to symbolize worship offerings. Additionally, Stein found various artefacts at the site that he believed were evidence of Farhad-beg-yailaki's relations with various differing cultures.

Within the site there are several murals and statues displaying two significant Buddhist mythological figures. One being the mother of demons, Hariti, and the other is the bodhisattva Avalokitesvara, both of which are portrayed wearing fabrics with Sassanian motifs. The mural containing the figure of Hariti from Farhad-beg-yailaki is thought to specifically demonstrate the Khotanese school of painting style, which was highly admired in contemporary China and was in high demand during the late Sui dynasty. This style of painting was also regarded highly in Tibet and is thought to have had a significant impact on Tibetan culture during the eighth century.

== Artefacts and collections ==
During Sir Stein's three Silk Road expeditions, he uncovered clay seal impressions along with terracotta pottery fragments, both displaying classical mythological images, such as the Trojan prince Ganymede and depictions of winged horses.

Several of these fragmented terracotta vessels, along with fragments of woven plant fiber, silk, and wool obtained during these expeditions are on loan from the Government of India to the Victoria and Albert Museum, the British Museum, and the British Library, all in London, England.
