= Domoko =

Archeologic site in China

Domoko is a ruined village site (known as Old Domoko) located in the eastern region of the Khotan oasis in China, about 20 kilometers north the Domoko administrative center, on the southern arm of the Silk Road. The site is located in the Xinjiang autonomous region.

The village was abandoned in the middle of the 19th century because the shortage of water-supply and the consequently shift of cultivation, according to the local villagers.

== Archaeology ==
Domoko was explored by Sir Aurel Stein in 1906 on his first Central Asia expedition. Stein found an abandoned village and described the archaeological remains and conservation conditions of the buildings:

Here we had reached the southern edge of 'old Domoko', an area covered with the remains of a deserted village group. The crumbling ruins of mud-built dwellings, constructed and arranged exactly as in the now inhabited villages of this tract and forming detached groups, seemed to extend, together with the interspersed orchards, cemeteries and fields, for about three miles from east to west. Going towards the north-west we kept between them for nearly three miles. The mud-walls, strengthened by the insertion of vertical bundles of Kumush, still rose often 4 to 5 ft. above the ground, and the massive fireplaces were intact even to a greater height […] The deserted homesteads had been stripped of all materials that could be of use, such as beams, wooden doorposts, &c. As scarcely any sand had accumulated about the crumbling ruins, their rapid and complete disappearance seemed inevitable as soon as erosion set in.

— Aurel Stein, Ancient Khotan: Vol. I p. 458

Excavations were apparently "rushed" as Stein was keen to return to Niya, a site where he was carrying out more thorough excavations.

== Art and Artefacts ==
The finds from Domoko appear to have consisted primarily of wooden panels, located in the ruins of a sanctuary near the oasis. The rectangular panels were painted with images of Buddha, Bodhisattvas and various other Buddhist-Hindu deities. One of key points of interest relating to the Silk Roads is the exchange of ideas, particularly in regards to technology and religion. Some of the most significant finds have been those related to the development and expansion of Buddhism in China. The most famous examples are the silk paintings and scrolls found at Dunhuang and given to the British Museum by Aurel Stein.

== Oases and UNESCO ==
More recently the oases of the Silk Road have re-entered archaeological discourse. As UNESCO tries to incorporate a more diverse range of sites into its 'World Heritage' portfolio, the concept of 'serial nominations' has emerged. The oases positioned along the Silk Road were pivotal to its existence, providing fresh supplies and diverse markets to the trading caravans. Nominations for the sites that made up the 'Silk Road's Oasis Route in China' are now being identified, and will make up a part of the far more extensive serial nomination, the aim of which is to include key sites across the entire Silk Road route.
