= Sanghata Sutra =

The Sanghata Sutra (Ārya Sanghāta Sūtra; Devanagari, आर्य सङ्घाट सूत्र) is a Mahāyāna Buddhist scripture widely circulated in northwest India and Central Asia.

== History and background ==
Although the Sanghāta circulated first in Sanskrit, it was subsequently translated into all the major languages of Buddhist communities to the north, northwest and east of India: Khotanese, Chinese, Sogdian and Tibetan. This translation work took place over the course of the 5th through 10th centuries of the common era.

Manuscripts of the Sanghāta have been recovered in Gilgit (in 1931 and 1938), Khotan, Dunhuang, and other sites in Central Asia along the silk route.

== Translations ==
=== Khotanese translation ===
The Khotanese translation of the Sanghāta is the oldest translation into a vernacular language that we have. The Sanghāta had been translated into Khotanese sometime before the middle of the 5th century CE. Fragments of varying lengths survive in 27 manuscripts of the Sanghāta in Khotanese.

An edition of the existing Khotanese version of the Sanghāta was published in 1993 by Giotto Canevascini, with an English translation of the Khotanese and corresponding Sanskrit. (There are major portions of the Sanskrit missing from the Khotanese version.)

=== Sogdian translation ===
Fragments of a Sogdian translation of the Sanghāta were recovered from sites in Central Asia, including Turpan.

=== Chinese translations ===
The Chinese Buddhist canon contains two translations of the Sanghāta, one produced around the middle of the 6th century CE by an Indian named Upashūnya, who was said to be the son of a king of Ujjayini in south India. The second Chinese translation was completed around the turn of the 10th century, by another Indian named Danāpāla, who was a prolific translator into Chinese with over 100 translations of various Buddhist texts to his credit.

The two translations appear on the CBETA electronic edition of the Taisho collection as texts numbered 423 and 424, respectively. Of the two Chinese translations, the earlier translation (number 423) appears to correspond a bit more closely to the Sanskrit manuscripts of the Sanghāta that have survived.

=== Tibetan translation ===
The Sanghāta was translated into Tibetan in the 9th century CE. A colophon at the end of that translation suggests that there had been an earlier translation, now lost, whose 'language was updated' by the only translation that survives.

=== English translation ===
This translation into English was prepared by Ven. Lhundup Damchö and completed in January, 2006. Translating from Tibetan, she consulted the Sanskrit to clarify the many places where the Tibetan was ambiguous. The Sanskrit was also at times ambiguous or multivalent, and in those same places you may find the English to be open to multiple interpretations.

== Contemporary scholarly study of the Sanghāta ==
The majority of scholarly interest in the Sanghāta to date has been philological. A number of critical editions have been prepared by European scholars. These editors made invaluable contributions to the study of the Sanghāta, through their work dating and editing its manuscripts, but found the content of the text 'confused' (Oskar von Hinüber, in a 1980 article) or 'cryptic' (Giotto Canevascini in his 1993 work).

Since Gregory Schopen's influential article in 1979 suggesting that the Mahāyāna may have begun as a loose federation of groups centered around particular sutras -— what he called the 'cult of the book' -- his assertion has been widely accepted as descriptive of the history of the early Mahāyāna. The Sanghāta Sūtra, which imagines itself as the focus of intense worship, is a prime example of this category.

Art historian Deborah Klimburg-Salter has considered the impact that the Sanghāta may have had on the culture around it. In a 1987 article, she points out that the fact that the decorative manuscript covers found with the Sanghāta in Gilgit were among the very earliest suggests that the text itself played a pivotal role in shifting attitudes towards books in India:

The Gilgit manuscript covers, as well as manuscripts from the find, mark an important phase in the history of the art of the book in India.... That is, that a change took place in the concept of the book so that books were seen not merely as media for the conveyance of information but, for some reason or reasons as yet unclear, began to be conceived of as objects worthy of beautification. As we shall see, one possibility, which needs further consideration, is that this development was affected by the evolution of certain texts into cult objects.

(Klimburg-Salter, 1987:817)

== Meaning of the name Sanghāta ==
As one linguist who studied the Sanskrit and Khotanese versions of the Sanghāta put it, "the cryptic aspects of the sutra also extend to its title."

In standard Sanskrit, sanghāta is a term meaning the 'fitting and joining of timbers' or 'the work done by a carpenter in joining two pieces of wood,' and can refer to carpentry in general. It has a specialized use in a few Buddhist Sanskrit texts, where it means 'vessel' or 'jar,' and this image of 'something that contains' is evoked several times within the sutra, when Buddha calls the Sanghāta a 'treasury of Dharma.'

Whether we take sanghāta as having the sense of joining or connecting that it has in standard Sanskrit, or the sense of holding or containing that it can have in Buddhist Sanskrit, the question remains as to just what is connected or held.

One possible interpretation is that what is connected are sentient beings, and they are joined or connected by the Sanghāta to enlightenment. This suggestion—that what the Sanghāta joins is sentient beings to enlightenment—was offered by Kirti Tsenshab Rinpoche during an oral transmission of the text in 2003. In this, we find an idea that we readers and reciters are the material that the Sanghāta is working on, as it shapes us, and connects us to our enlightenment in such a way that we will never turn back. This, indeed, is what Sarvashura initially requests the Buddha to give: a teaching that can ensure that the young ones are never disconnected from their path to enlightenment.

=== Early translators understanding of the Sanghāta ===
Translators of the Sanghāta have taken a fairly broad range of stances on the question of the title's meaning. The two earliest translations we have —- the Khotanese and the first of the two Chinese translations—do not translate the name at all. This decision by the Khotanese translator of the Sanghāta to leave the name 'Sanghāta' in Sanskrit is particularly striking, because the general strategy that Khotanese translators took was to translate the meanings of words wherever possible, rather than leaving them in Sanskrit. Thus in Khotanese even the word 'Buddha' is translated, trying to capture the meaning rather than treating it as a proper name and leaving it as 'Buddha,' as in English.

The Chinese translation was produced by an Indian scholar working in China in the 6th century, while the Khotanese was produced some time before the middle of the 5th century, a time when contact between Indian and Khotanese scholars would still have been relatively easy. If there was any common knowledge, or received wisdom as to what the title meant, it seems likely that these translators would have had access to it. Since they did not choose to translate the titles into local languages, we can speculate that either they thought it important to leave the name of the sutra in Sanskrit for some reason, or they felt that there was no easy answer to the question: what exactly does the name mean?

The next two translations to be completed—into Tibetan and then into Chinese for a second time—both chose to translate the term 'sanghāta' into their own languages, but did so in different ways.

The second translator into Chinese rendered the title of the sutra in Chinese as The Sutra of the Great Gathering of the Holy Dharma. (In Chinese, Ta chi hui cheng fa ching in the Wade–Giles transliteration system, or Ta ji-hui zheng-fa jing in Pinyin.)

The Tibetan translation of 'Sanghāta' is sanctioned by the authoritative glossary used for the translation of Sanskrit terms into Tibetan, known as the Mahavyutpatti. This glossary was compiled in the 9th century in Tibet by a team of respected translators, under the royal decree of the Tibetan king Tri Ralpachen. In it, 'Sanghāta sutra' is translated as 'The Sutra of the Pair of Monastic Assemblies,' or 'The Sutra of the Pair of Sanghas' (dge 'dun zung gi mdo). This seems to suggest that what are paired, or joined together, are two assemblies of Sangha. As understood by these translators, 'Sanghāta' in the title refers to a pair of monastic assemblies.

But which two monastic assemblies are paired? During the Sanghāta, groups are assembling right up to the final pages of the sutra, but most of those who gather are not identified even as Buddhists, much less monastic assemblies. In the Sanghāta, there are no two clear groups of ordained Sangha.

But there is one prominent pair of groups in the Sanghāta: the groups of young and old beings. Just who the young and old are is another topic open to discussion, but it is clear that a group of young beings is brought together with a group of old beings in the Sanghāta. Indeed, in the question that initiates the dialogue, Sarvashura asks for a teaching that can benefit young and old at the same time—a teaching for a pair of groups.

However, in most (but not all) of the editions of the Tibetan canon, or bka' 'gyur (kagyur), the title of the text is simply rendered as 'Zung,' omitting the reference to monastic assembly or Sangha. And in the text itself, in all the editions of the canon, wherever we had 'Sanghāta' in Sanskrit, the text says simply 'zung,' and does not mention any assembly or Sangha.

=== Further note on Sanghāta in Sanskrit ===
The 'sangha' in Sanghāta does not appear to be the same as the 'sangha' in Sangha. In 'Sanghāta' the second 'a' is long (this the long marker over the 'a') and the 't' is retroflex.

== See also ==
- Silk Road transmission of Buddhism
