= Niya ruins =

Archeological site in Tarim Basin, Xinjiang

Niya
- Cadota 尼雅
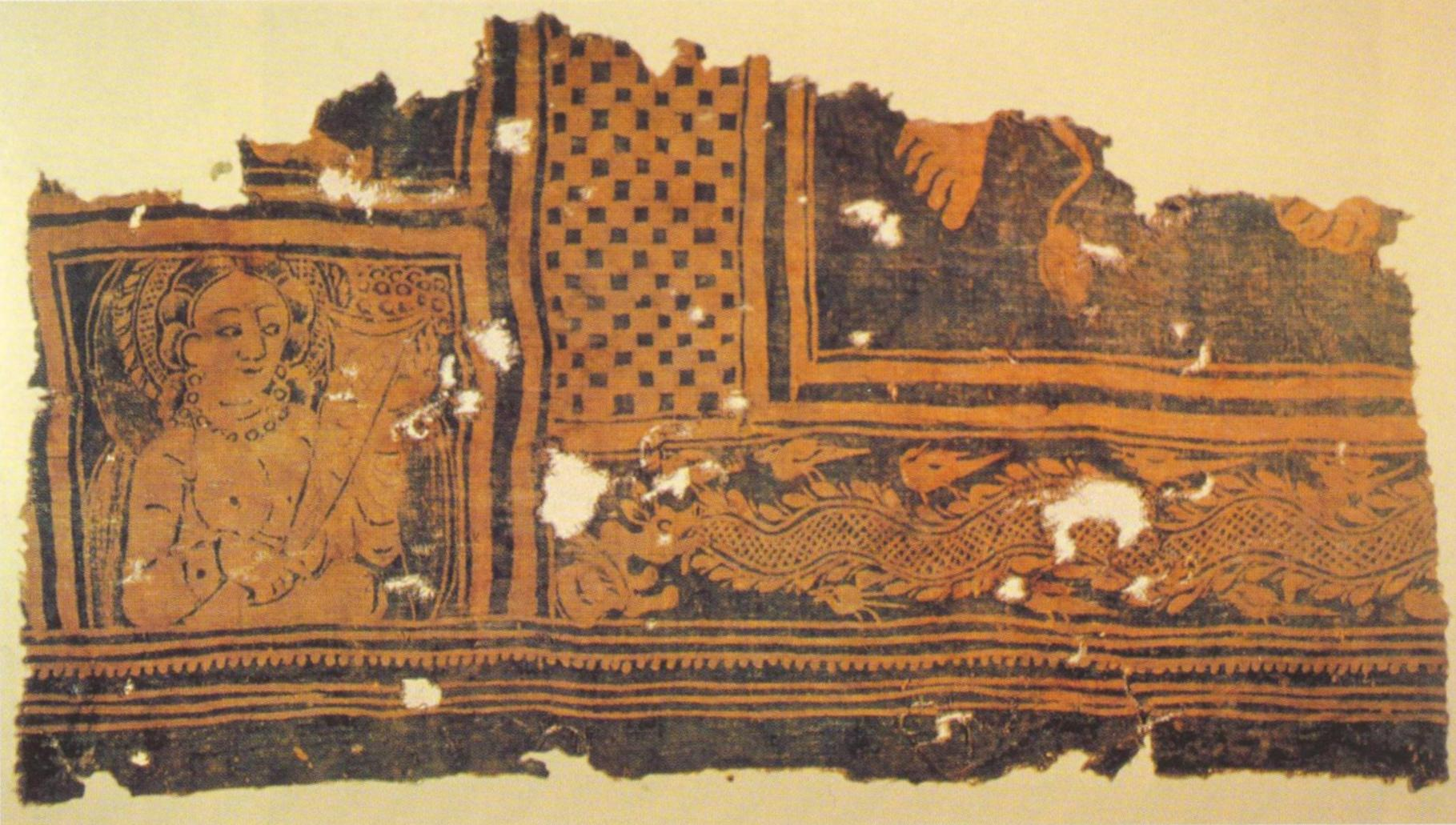
- Textile from Niya, showing influences from the East and the West.

- Location within Xinjiang
- 38.021400°N 82.737600°E
- Type: Settlement
- Location: Xinjiang, China

History
- Abandoned: 4th to 5th century

Site notes
- Condition: In ruins

The Niya ruins (simplified Chinese: 尼雅遗址; traditional Chinese: 尼雅遺址; pinyin: Níyǎ Yízhǐ), is an archaeological site located about 115 km (71 mi) north of modern Niya Town on the southern edge of the Tarim Basin in modern-day Xinjiang, China. The ancient site was known in its native language as Caḍ́ota, and in Chinese during the Han dynasty as Jingjue (Chinese: 精絕; pinyin: Jīngjué, Old Chinese tseng-dzot). Numerous ancient archaeological artifacts have been uncovered at the site.

Niya was once a major commercial center on an oasis on the southern branch of the Silk Road in the southern Taklamakan Desert. During ancient times camel caravans would cut through, carrying goods from China to Central Asia.

== History ==
In Hanshu, an independent oasis state called Jingjue, generally thought to be Niya, is mentioned:

The seat of the king's government is the town of Jingjue, and it is distant by 8,820 li [probably 3,667 km/2,279 miles] from Ch'ang-an. There are 480 households, 3,350 individuals with 500 persons able to bear arm. [There are the following officials] the commandant of Jingjue, the leaders of the left and the right and an interpreter-in-chief.

— Hanshu, chapter 96a, translation from Hulsewé 1979.

Niya became part of Loulan Kingdom, which has been renamed Shanshan by the Han dynasty in 77 BCE, by the third century. Shanshan maintained a diplomatic relationship with several Chinese dynasties, including Cao Wei in the third century, the Jin dynasty in the fourth century, and Northern Wei in the fifth century. Towards the end of the fourth century it was under Chinese suzerainty. Later it was conquered by Tibet.

== Excavations ==
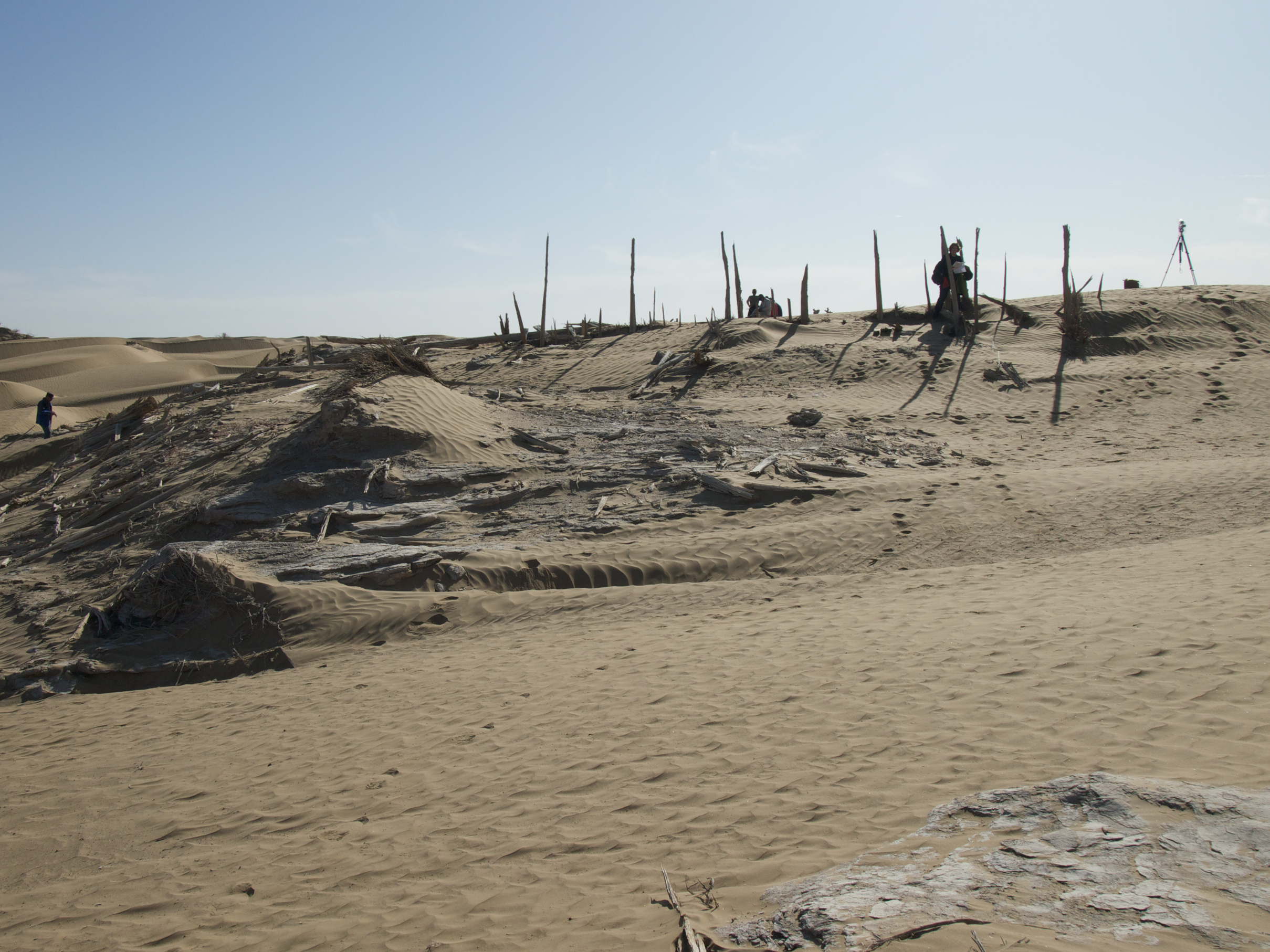
Niya site where Aurel Stein found wooden tablets

In 1900, Aurel Stein set out on an expedition to western China and the Taklamakan Desert. In Niya he excavated several groups of dwellings, and found 100 wooden tablets written in 105 CE. These tablets bore clay seals, official orders and letters written in Kharoshthi, an early Indic script, dating them to the Kushan Empire, or to Gandharan migrants influenced by Kushan and Indian bureaucratic traditions. During his excavations Stein also uncovered a number of wooden documents from N. xv. written in Chinese. These documents were made of narrow "slips" of wood with writing confined to a single row of characters. Stein also found a series of clay seals with impressions of Athena Alkidemos, together with others representing Eros, Heracles, or a different version of Athena. Other finds include coins and documents dating from the Han dynasty, Roman coins, an ancient mouse trap, a walking stick, part of a guitar, a bow in working order, a carved stool, an elaborately designed rug and other textile fragments, as well as many other household objects such as wooden furniture with elaborate carving, pottery, Chinese basketry and lacquer ware. Aurel Stein visited Niya four times between 1901 and 1931.

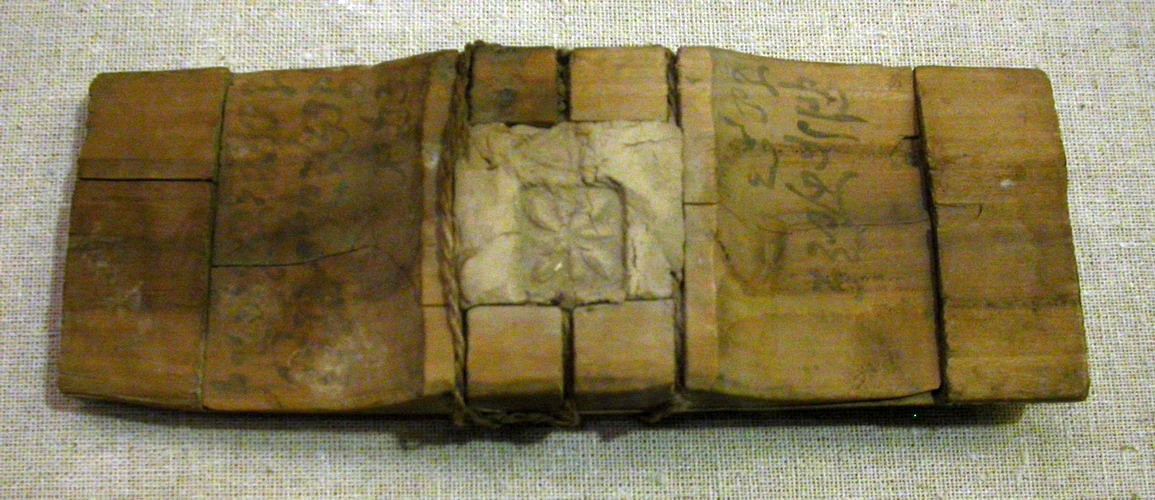
Wooden tablet inscribed with Kharosthi characters

Official approval for joint Sino-Japanese archaeological excavations at the site was given in 1994. Researchers have now found remains of human habitation including approximately 100 dwellings, burial areas, sheds for animals, orchards, gardens, and agricultural fields. They have also found in the dwellings well-preserved tools such as iron axes and sickles, wooden clubs, pottery urns and jars of preserved crops. The human remains found there have led to speculation on the origins of these peoples.

In 2007, when the Xinjiang Institute of Archaeology's research group on Niya was editing the third volume of the Report on the Sino-Japanese Joint Expedition in Niya,2 they carefully examined a "parchment text" found in Niya. After the string was untied, it was found that the paper had been used to wrap up a powder of vegetable origin, perhaps spices or medicine. When the powder was removed, a text written in black ink in a clear script was visible. Noting that the writing appeared to be the same as that of the Sogdian "Ancient Letters" found near Dunhuang, which were written in the early fourth century. Three other Sogdian fragments of similar date found at Loulan, the local archaeologists were able to determine that this new fragment was also written in early Sogdian script.

Some archeological findings from the ruins of Niya are housed in the Tokyo National Museum. Others are part of the Stein collection in the British Museum, the British Library, and the National Museum in New Delhi.

Ancient texts included the mention and names of various regional rulers.

== See also ==
- Tarim mummies
- Shanshan
- Loulan Kingdom
- Charklik
- Dandan Oilik
- Miran

== Notes ==
- http://history.yale.edu/sites/default/files/files/hansen-religious-life-niya.pdf
