= Christian Lassen =

Norwegian-German orientalist (1800–1876)

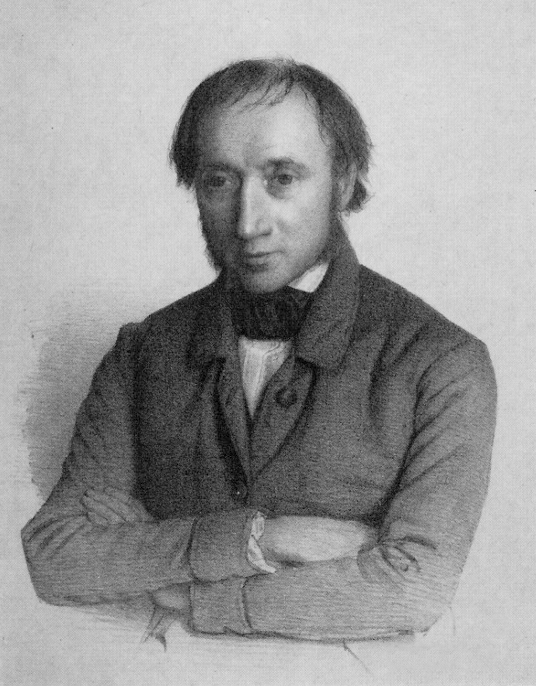
Christian Lassen drawing by Adolf Hohneck, 1859

Christian Lassen (22 October 1800 – 8 May 1876) was a Norwegian-born, German orientalist and Indologist. He was a professor of Old Indian language and literature at the University of Bonn.

== Biography ==
Lassen was born at Bergen, Norway where he attended Bergen Cathedral School. Having received an education at the University of Oslo, he moved to Germany and continued his studies at the University of Heidelberg and the University of Bonn where Lassen acquired a sound knowledge of Sanskrit. He spent three years in Paris and London, engaged in copying and collating manuscripts, and collecting materials for future research, especially with reference to Hindu drama and philosophy. During this period he published, jointly with Eugène Burnouf, his first work, Essai sur le Pâli (Paris, 1826).

On his return to Bonn he studied Arabic, and took the degree of Ph.D., his dissertation discussing the Arabic notices of the geography of the Punjab (Commentario geographica historica de Pentapotamia Indica, Bonn, 1827). Soon after he was admitted Privatdozent, and in 1830 was appointed extraordinary and in 1840 ordinary professor of Old Indian language and literature. Lassen remained at the University of Bonn to the end of his life. Having been affected with almost total blindness for many years, by 1864 he was allowed to give up lecturing. He died at Bonn and was buried at Alter Friedhof.

== Work ==
In 1829–1831 Lassen brought out, in conjunction with August Wilhelm von Schlegel, a critical annotated edition of the Hitopadeśa. The appearance of this edition marks the starting-point of the critical study of Sanskrit literature. Lassen assisted von Schlegel in editing and translating the first two cantos of the epic Rāmāyana (1829-1838). In 1832 he brought out the text of the first act of Bhavabhuti's drama, Mālatīmādhava, and a complete edition, with a Latin translation, of the Sānkhya-kārikā. In 1837 followed his edition and translation of Jayadeva's charming lyrical drama, Gītagovinda and his Institutiones linguae Pracriticae. His Anthologia Sanscritica, which came out the following year, contained several hitherto unpublished texts, and did much to stimulate the study of Sanskrit in German universities. In 1846 Lassen brought out an improved edition of Schlegel's text and translation of the "Bhagavad Gita".

As well as the study of Indian languages, he was a scientific pioneer in other fields of philological inquiry. In his Beiträge zur Deutung der Eugubinischen Tafeln (1833) he prepared the way for the correct interpretation of the Umbrian inscriptions; and the Zeitschrift für die Kunde des Morgenlandes (7 vols., 1837–1850), started and largely conducted by him, contains, among other valuable papers from his pen, grammatical sketches of the Beluchi and Brahui languages, and an essay on the Lycian inscriptions.

=== Old Persian cuneiform ===
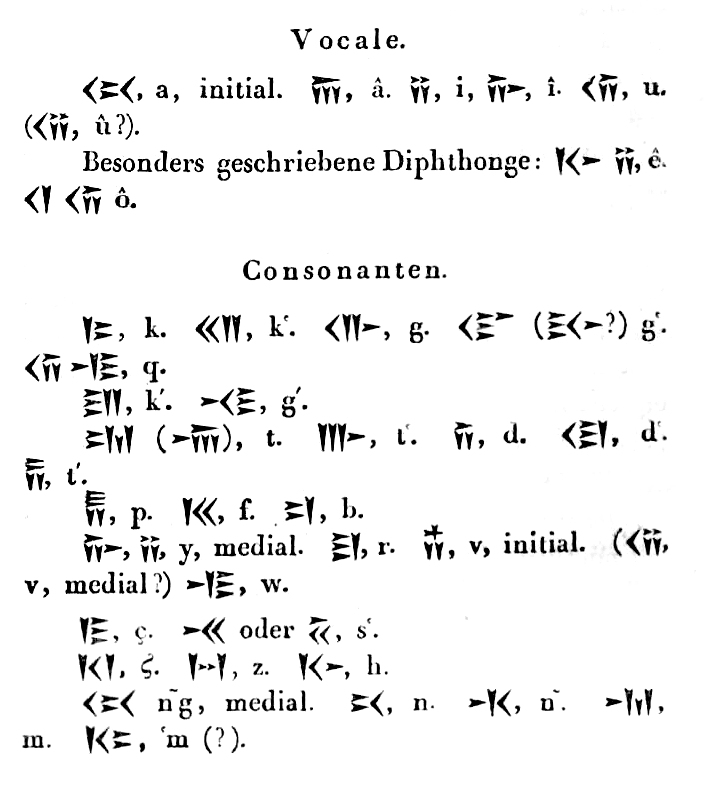
Old Persian cuneiform alphabet according to Lassen in 1836

Soon after the appearance of Burnouf's Commentaire sur le Yacna (1833), Lassen also directed his attention to the Zend language, and to Iranian studies generally; and in Die altpersischen Keilinschriften von Persepolis (1836) he greatly improved the knowledge of the Old Persian cuneiform inscriptions, following the early efforts of Grotefend (1802) and Saint-Martin (1823). thereby anticipating, by one month, Burnouf's Mémoire on the same subject, while Sir Henry Rawlinson's famous memoir on the Behistun Inscription, though drawn up in Persia, at about the same time, did not reach the Royal Asiatic Society until three years later, 1839.

Subsequently, Lassen published, in the sixth volume of his journal (1845), a collection of all the Old Persian cuneiform inscriptions known up to that date. According to Sayce:

(Lassen's)...contributions to the decipherment of the inscriptions were numerous and important. He succeeded in fixing the true values of nearly all the letters in the Persian alphabet, in translating the texts, and in proving that the language of them was not Zend, but stood to both Zend and Sanskrit in the relation of a sister.

— Sayce

=== Brahmi script ===
The first successful attempts at deciphering the Brahmi script were made in 1836 by Christian Lassen, who used a bilingual Greek-Brahmi coin of Indo-Greek king Agathocles to correctly identify several Brahmi letters. The task was then completed by James Prinsep, who was able to identify the rest of the Brahmi characters, with the help of Major Cunningham.

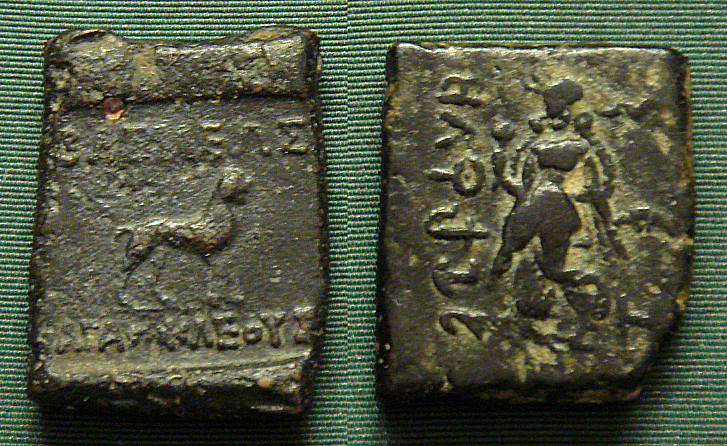
Lassen used the bilingual Greek-Brahmi coinage of Indo-Greek kings Agathocles and Pantaleon to correctly decipher the Brahmi script.

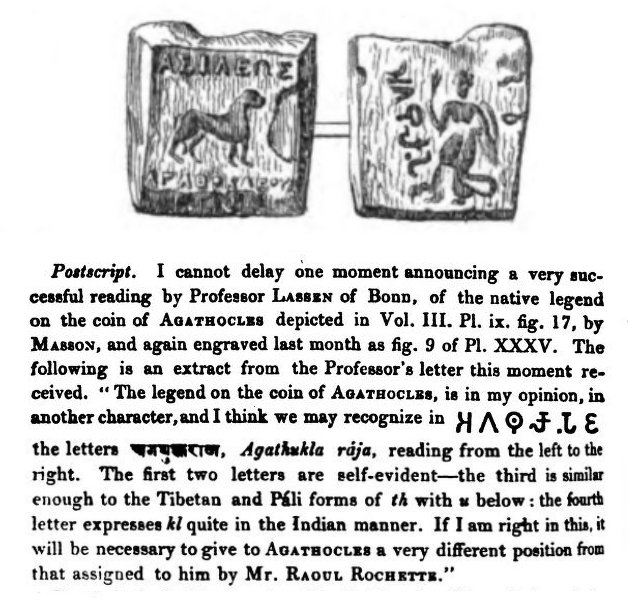
Announcement by James Prinsep of the secure decipherement of the first Brahmi letters by Lassen in the Journal of the Asiatic Society of Bengal, in 1836.

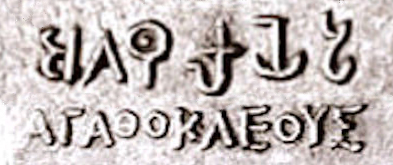
Identical regnal names Agathuklayesa (Brahmi: 𑀅𑀕𑀣𑀼𑀼𑀓𑁆𑀮𑁂𑀬𑁂𑀲) and Agathokles (Greek: ΑΓΑΘΟΚΛΕΟΥΣ) on a bilingual coin of Agathocles, used by Christian Lassen to decipher securely the first Brahmi letters.

=== Kharoshthi ===
He also was one of the first scholars in Europe who took up, with signal success, the decipherment of the newly discovered Bactrian, Indo-Greek and Indo-Scythian coins with Kharoshthi legends, which furnished him the materials for Zur Geschichte der griechischen und indoskythsschen Könige in Bakterien, Kabul, und Indien (1838). In this, he closely followed the pioneering work of James Prinsep (1835), and Carl Ludwig Grotefend (1836).

He contemplated bringing out a critical edition of the Vendidad; but, after publishing the first five fargards (1852), he felt that his whole energies were required for the successful accomplishment of the great undertaking of his life—his Indische Altertumskunde. In this work—completed in four volumes, published respectively in 1847 (2nd ed., 1867), 1849 (2nd ed., 1874), 1858 and 1861—which forms one of the greatest monuments of untiring industry and critical scholarship, everything that could be gathered from native and foreign sources, relative to the political, social and intellectual development of India. He was elected a Foreign Honorary Member of the American Academy of Arts and Sciences in 1868.

== Other sources ==
- “Christian Lassen,” Allgemeine Deutsche Biographie, Band 17, Leipzig: Duncker & Humblot, 1883, S. 784–788. (in German)
- “Christian Lassen,” Meyers Konversations-Lexikon, 4. Auflage von 1888–1890. (in German)
- Lassen, Christian (1836). Altpersischen Keil-Inschriften von Persepolis. Bonn, E. Weber.
- Lassen, Christian (1838). Zur Geschichte der griechischen und indoskythischen Könige in Baktrien, Kabul und Indien durch Entzifferung der altkabulischen Legenden auf ihren Münzen. Bonn, H. B. König.
