= Kharoshthi (Unicode block) =

- Range: U+10A00..U+10A5F (96 code points)
- Plane: SMP
- Scripts: Kharoshthi
- Major alphabets: Gandhari; Sanskrit
- Assigned: 68 code points
- Unused: 28 reserved code points

Unicode Version History
- 4.1 (2005): 65 (+65)
- 11.0 (2018): 68 (+3)

Unicode documentation
- Code chart ∣ Web page

Kharoshthi is a Unicode block containing characters used to write the Gandhari and Sanskrit languages in northwest India from the 3rd century BCE to the 4th century CE.

Kharoshthi^{[1]}^{[2]} Official Unicode Consortium code chart (PDF)
	0	1	2	3	4	5	6	7	8	9	A	B	C	D	E	F
U+10A0x	𐨀	𐨁	𐨂	𐨃		𐨅	𐨆						𐨌	𐨍	𐨎	𐨏
U+10A1x	𐨐	𐨑	𐨒	𐨓		𐨕	𐨖	𐨗		𐨙	𐨚	𐨛	𐨜	𐨝	𐨞	𐨟
U+10A2x	𐨠	𐨡	𐨢	𐨣	𐨤	𐨥	𐨦	𐨧	𐨨	𐨩	𐨪	𐨫	𐨬	𐨭	𐨮	𐨯
U+10A3x	𐨰	𐨱	𐨲	𐨳	𐨴	𐨵			𐨸	𐨹	𐨺					𐨿
U+10A4x	𐩀	𐩁	𐩂	𐩃	𐩄	𐩅	𐩆	𐩇	𐩈							
U+10A5x	𐩐	𐩑	𐩒	𐩓	𐩔	𐩕	𐩖	𐩗	𐩘							
Notes 1.As of Unicode version 17.0 2.Grey areas indicate non-assigned code points

== History ==
The following Unicode-related documents record the purpose and process of defining specific characters in the Kharoshthi block:

Version	Final code points (Note: Proposed code points and characters names may differ from final code points and names)	Count	L2 ID	WG2 ID	Document
4.1	U+10A00..10A03, 10A05..10A06, 10A0C..10A13, 10A15..10A17, 10A19..10A33, 10A38..10A3A, 10A3F..10A47, 10A50..10A58	65	L2/02-203R2	N2524	Glass, Andrew; Baums, Stefan; Salomon, Richard (2002-09-19), Proposal to Encode Kharoshthi in Plane 1 of ISO/IEC 10646
4.1	U+10A00..10A03, 10A05..10A06, 10A0C..10A13, 10A15..10A17, 10A19..10A33, 10A38..10A3A, 10A3F..10A47, 10A50..10A58	65	L2/02-424		McGowan, Rick (2002-11-20), Supplementary Information to Accompany L2/02-203R2, Proposal to Encode Kharoshthi
4.1	U+10A00..10A03, 10A05..10A06, 10A0C..10A13, 10A15..10A17, 10A19..10A33, 10A38..10A3A, 10A3F..10A47, 10A50..10A58	65	L2/03-314R2	N2732	Glass, Andrew; Baums, Stefan; Salomon, Richard (2003-09-18), Proposal to Encode Kharoshthi in Plane 1 of ISO/IEC 10646
4.1	U+10A00..10A03, 10A05..10A06, 10A0C..10A13, 10A15..10A17, 10A19..10A33, 10A38..10A3A, 10A3F..10A47, 10A50..10A58	65		N2956	Freytag, Asmus (2005-08-12), "Representative glyphs for U+17D2 and U+10A3F", Unicode Consortium Liaison Report for WG2 Meeting #47
4.1	U+10A00..10A03, 10A05..10A06, 10A0C..10A13, 10A15..10A17, 10A19..10A33, 10A38..10A3A, 10A3F..10A47, 10A50..10A58	65	L2/05-180		Moore, Lisa (2005-08-17), "Consensus 104-C12", UTC #104 Minutes, "Change the representative glyphs for Kharoshthi U+10A3F and Khmer U+17D2 to be the same as U+17D2, but with both enclosed in a dashed box..."
4.1	U+10A00..10A03, 10A05..10A06, 10A0C..10A13, 10A15..10A17, 10A19..10A33, 10A38..10A3A, 10A3F..10A47, 10A50..10A58	65		N2953 (pdf, doc)	Umamaheswaran, V. S. (2006-02-16), "M47.16 (Miscellaneous glyph defects)", Unconfirmed minutes of WG 2 meeting 47, Sophia Antipolis, France; 2005-09-12/15
11.0	U+10A34..10A35, 10A48	3	L2/17-012	N4812	Glass, Andrew; Baums, Stefan (2017-01-17), Additional Characters for Kharoṣṭhī Script
11.0	U+10A34..10A35, 10A48	3	L2/17-037		Anderson, Deborah; Whistler, Ken; Pournader, Roozbeh; Glass, Andrew; Iancu, Laurențiu; Moore, Lisa; Liang, Hai; Ishida, Richard; Misra, Karan; McGowan, Rick (2017-01-21), "8. Kharoshthi", Recommendations to UTC #150 January 2017 on Script Proposals
11.0	U+10A34..10A35, 10A48	3	L2/17-016		Moore, Lisa (2017-02-08), "C.2.1", UTC #150 Minutes
