= Friedrich Wagenfeld =

German philologist and author

- Born: 3 January 1810; Bremen
- Died: 26 August 1846 (aged 36); Bremen

Friedrich Wagenfeld (3 January 1810 – 26 August 1846) was a German philologist and author born in Bremen.

== Life ==
Wegenfeld was born in Bremen in 1810.

From 1829 to 1832 Wegenfeld studied philology in Göttingen, and subsequently spent several years serving as a tutor in Brinkum. He lived and worked as a writer in Bremen, where he died on 26 August 1846, at the age of 36.

Wagenfeld was the author a popular collection of Bremen folk tales titled Bremer Volkssagen (1844–45). In 1837 he published what purportedly was the entire text of Philo of Byblos' Sanchoniathon, allegedly found in the Portuguese convent of Santa Maria de Merinhão. This publication, however, was soon afterwards proven by several scholars to be a fabrication.

Today there is a street named Lazy Street and the House of the Seven Lazy Brothers in Bremen which celebrate Wagenfeld's work and in particular his story of the Seven Lazy brothers.
