= Carl Ludwig Grotefend =

German regional historian and archivist

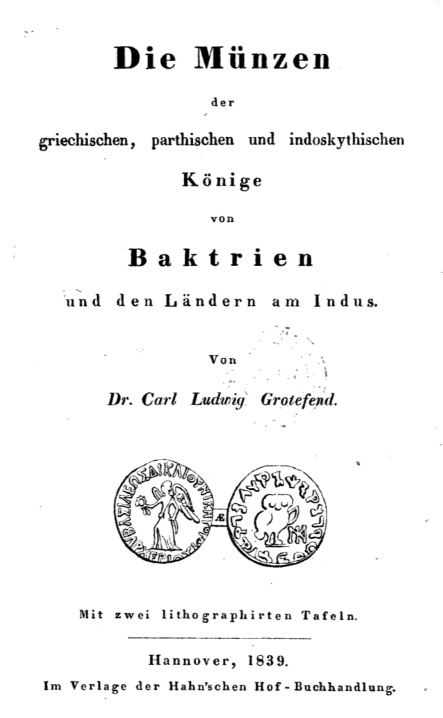
Die Münzen der griechischen, parthischen und indoskythischen Könige von Baktrien und den Ländern am Indus ("The coins of the Greek, Parthian and Indo-Scythian kings of Bactria and the countries on the Indus"), 1839

Carl Ludwig Grotefend (22 December 1807 – 27 October 1874) was a German epigraphist, philologist and numismatist. He played a key role in the decipherment of the Indian Kharoshthi script on the coinage of the Indo-Greek kings, around the same time as James Prinsep, publishing Die unbekannte Schrift der Baktrischen Münzen ("The unknown script of the Bactrian coins") in 1836. He was the son of the famous philologist Georg Friedrich Grotefend, who made the first successful attempts at deciphering Old Persian cuneiform.

It is thought that Carl Ludwig Grotefend independently accomplished the first decipherment of the Kharoshthi script (1836, in Blätter für Münzkunde, Germany) around the same time as Prinsep (1835, in the Journal of the Asiatic Society of Bengal, India), as Grotefend was "evidently not aware of the latter's article".

In 1839, he wrote Die Münzen der griechischen, parthischen und indoskythischen Könige von Baktrien und den Ländern am Indus ("The coins of the Greek, Parthian and Indo-Scythian kings of Bactria and the countries on the Indus").

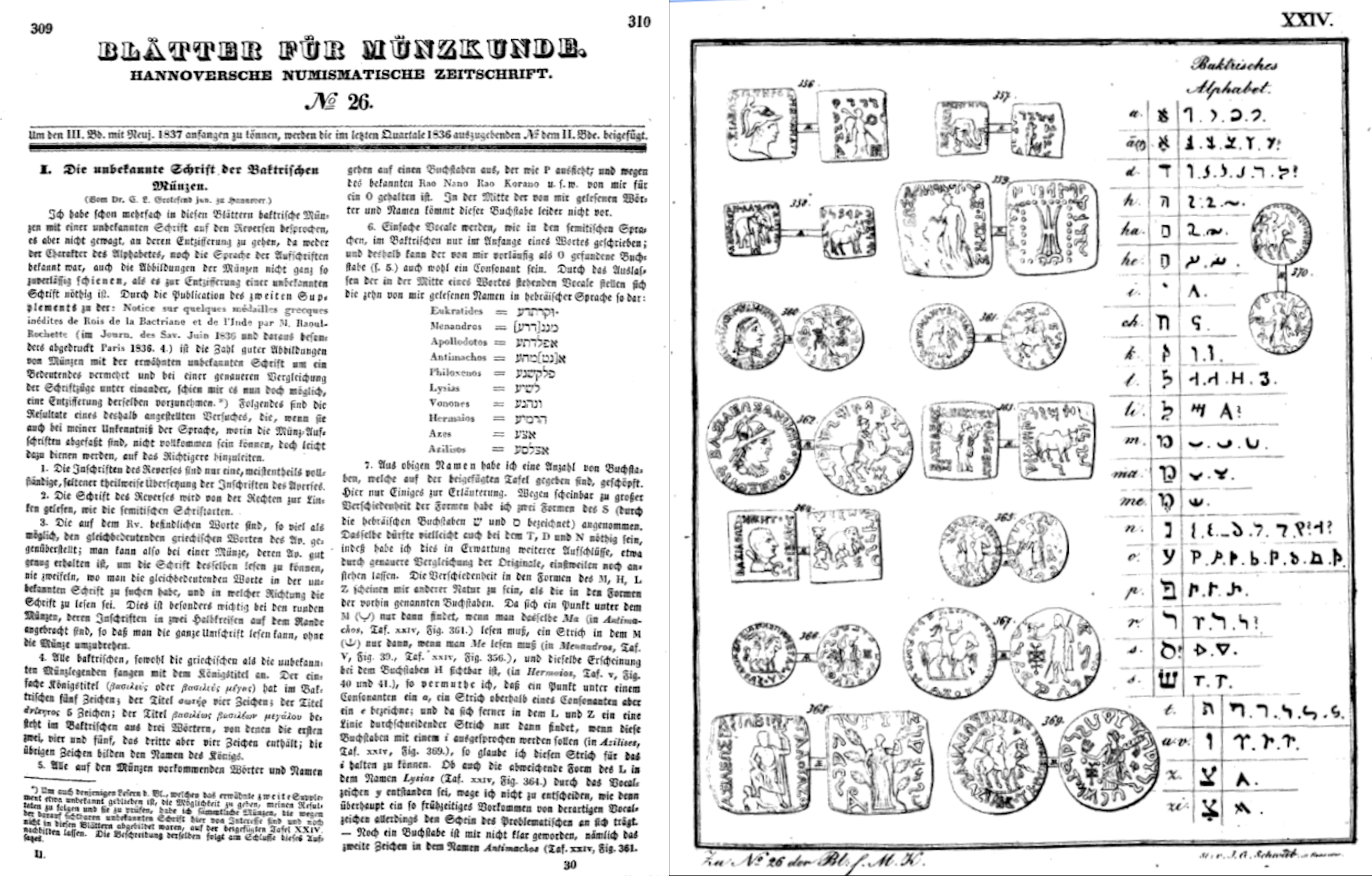
Decirpherment of Kharoshthi by C.L. Grotefend in Blatter fur Munzkunde in 1836.

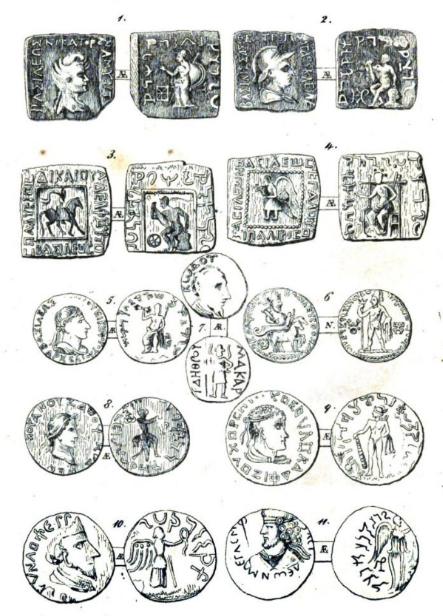
Coin plate, by Carl Ludwig Grotefend (1839)

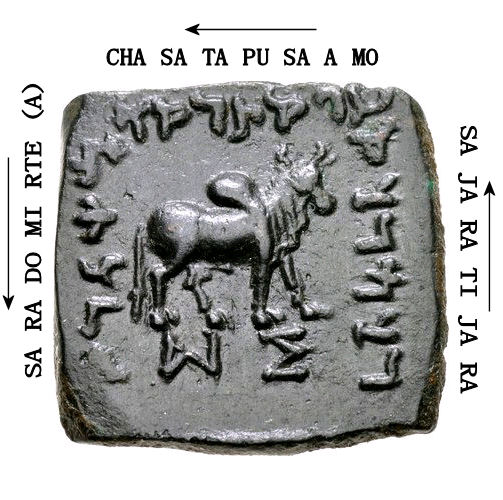
Kharoshthi on a coin of Indo-Greek king Artemidoros Aniketos, reading "Rajatirajasa Moasa Putasa cha Artemidorasa". The obverse has the same legend in Greek.

== Works ==
- Grotefend, Carl Ludwig (1836). Die unbekannte Schrift der Baktrischen Münzen (in Blätter für Münzkunde). Hannoversche numismatische Zeitschrift. Hrsg. von H. Grote (in German). Hahn. pp. 309–314.
- Grotefend, Carl Ludwig (1839). Die Münzen der griechischen, parthischen und indoskythischen Könige von Baktrien und den Ländern am Indus (in German). Hahn.
- Grotefend, Carl Ludwig; Culemann, Friedrich G. H. (1840). Geschichte der Buchdruckereien in den Hannoverschen und Braunschweigischen Landen ... Herausgegeben von F. G. H. Culemann (in German).
- Grotefend, Carl Ludwig (1867). Die Stempel der römischen Augenärzte (in German). Hahn.
- Grotefend, Carl Ludwig (1868). Eurykleides und Mikion, die Kephisier (in German). Dieterich'sche univ. buchdruckerei.
