= Kharosthi =

Ancient script of Central and South Asia

Kharosthi 𐨑𐨪𐨆𐨮𐨿𐨛𐨁𐨌
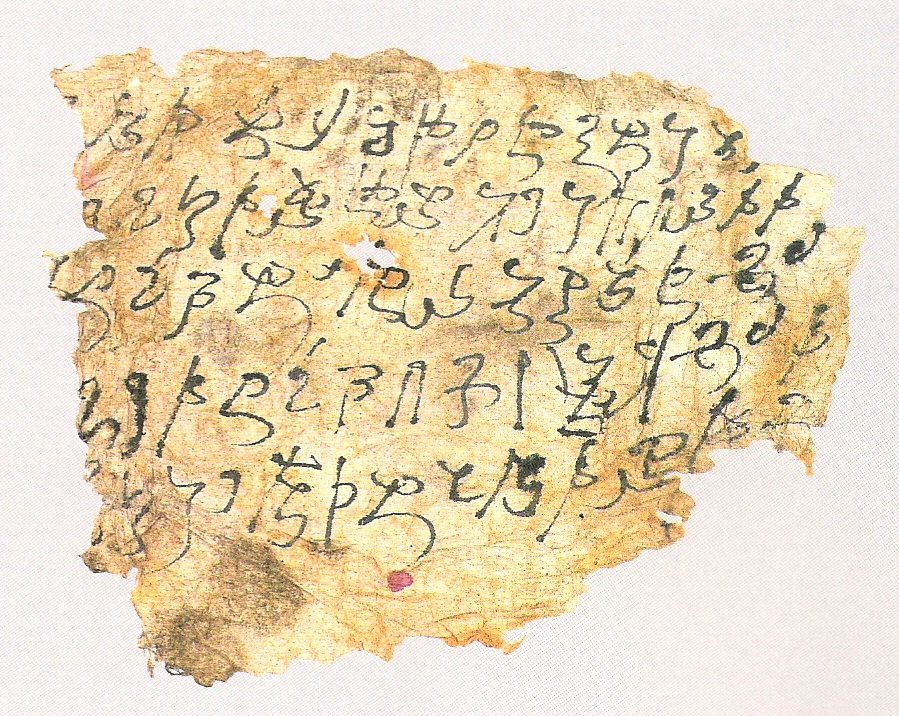
- Script type: Abugida
- Period: 4th century BCE – 3rd century CE
- Direction: Right-to-left script
- Languages: Gandhari Prakrit; Pali; Saka; Sanskrit

Related scripts
- Parent systems: Egyptian hieroglyphs: Proto-Sinaitic script; Phoenician alphabet; Aramaic alphabet; Kharosthi
- Sister systems: Nabataean alphabet; Brahmi script; Syriac alphabet; Palmyrene alphabet; Mandaic alphabet; Pahlavi scripts; Sogdian alphabet

ISO 15924
- ISO 15924: Khar (305), Kharoshthi

Unicode
- Unicode alias: Kharoshthi
- Unicode range: U+10A00–U+10A5F

Kharosthi script (Gāndhārī: 𐨑𐨪𐨆𐨮𐨿𐨛𐨁𐨌 𐨫𐨁𐨤𐨁, romanized: kharoṣṭhī lipi), also known as the Gandhari script (𐨒𐨌𐨣𐨿𐨢𐨌𐨪𐨁𐨌 𐨫𐨁𐨤𐨁, gāndhārī lipi), was an ancient Indic script originally developed in the Gandhara region of the present-day Afghanistan and Pakistan, between the 5th and 3rd century BCE. Primarily used by the people of Gandhara in various parts of South Asia and Central Asia, Kharosthi remained in use until it died out in its homeland around the 5th century CE. It was also in use in Bactria, Sogdia, and along the Silk Road. There is some evidence it may have survived until the 7th century in Khotan and Niya, both cities in Tarim Basin.

== History ==
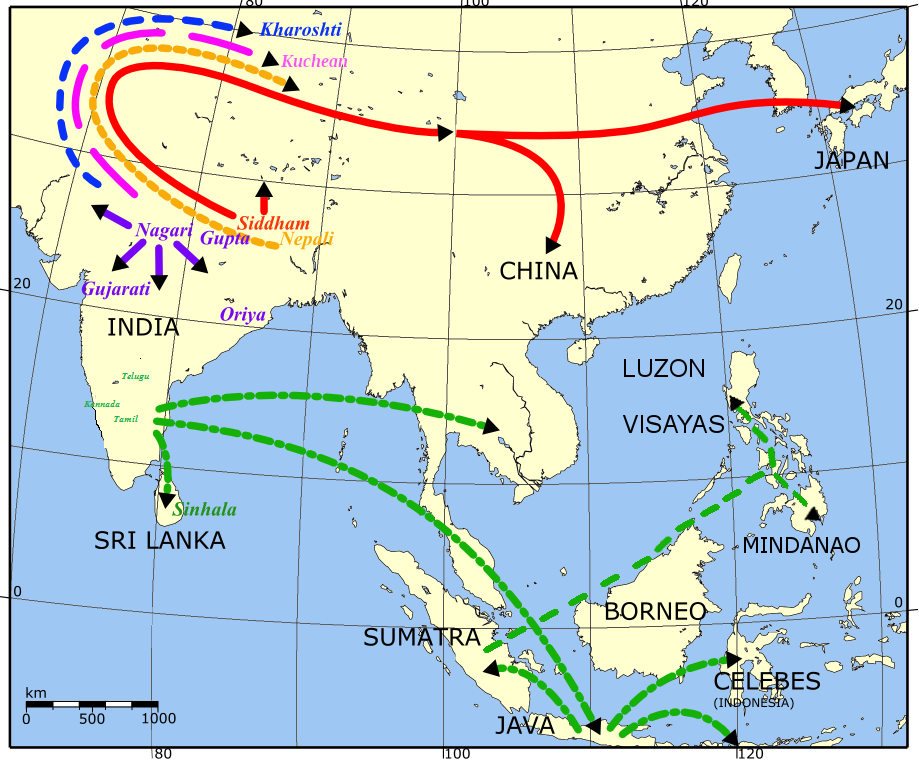
Routes of ancient scripts of the subcontinent traveling to other parts of Asia (Kharosthi shown in blue)

The name Kharosthi may derive from the Hebrew kharosheth, a Semitic word for writing, or from Old Iranian *xšaθra-pištra, which means "royal writing". The script was earlier also known as Indo-Bactrian script, Kabul script and Arian-Pali.

Scholars are not in agreement as to whether the Kharosthi script evolved gradually, or was the deliberate work of a single inventor. An analysis of the script forms shows a clear dependency on the Aramaic alphabet but with extensive modifications. Kharosthi seems to be derived from a form of Aramaic, which was used in administrative work during the reign of Darius the Great (in contrast with the monumental Old Persian cuneiform used for public inscriptions). One theory suggests that the Aramaic script arrived with the Achaemenid conquest of the Indus Valley in 500 BCE and evolved over the next 200+ years to reach its final form by the 3rd century BCE where it appears in some of the Edicts of Ashoka. However, no intermediate forms have yet been found to confirm this evolutionary model, and rock and coin inscriptions from the 3rd century BCE onward show a unified and standard form. An inscription in Aramaic dating back to the 4th century BCE was found in Sirkap, testifying to the presence of the Aramaic script in present-day Pakistan. According to Sir John Marshall, this seems to confirm that Kharosthi was later developed from Aramaic.

While the Brahmi script remained in use for centuries, Kharosthi seems to have been abandoned after the 2nd–3rd century AD. Because of the substantial differences between the Semitic-derived Kharosthi script and its successors, knowledge of Kharosthi may have declined rapidly once the script was supplanted by Brahmi-derived scripts, until its re-discovery by Western scholars in the 19th century.

The Kharosthi script was deciphered separately almost concomitantly by James Prinsep (in 1835, published in the Journal of the Asiatic society of Bengal, India) and by Carl Ludwig Grotefend (in 1836, published in Blätter für Münzkunde, Germany), with Grotefend "evidently not aware" of Prinsep's article, followed by Christian Lassen (1838). They all used the bilingual coins of the Indo-Greek Kingdom (obverse in Greek, reverse in Pali, using the Kharosthi script). This in turn led to the reading of the Edicts of Ashoka, some of which were written in the Kharosthi script (the Major Rock Edicts at Mansehra and Shahbazgarhi).

The study of the Kharosthi script was recently invigorated by the discovery of the Gandhāran Buddhist texts, a set of birch bark manuscripts written in Kharosthi, discovered near the Afghan city of Hadda just west of the Khyber Pass in Pakistan. The manuscripts were donated to the British Library in 1994. The entire set of British Library manuscripts are dated to the 1st century CE, although other collections from different institutions contain Kharosthi manuscripts from 1st century BCE to 3rd century CE, making them the oldest Buddhist manuscripts yet discovered.

== Alphabet ==
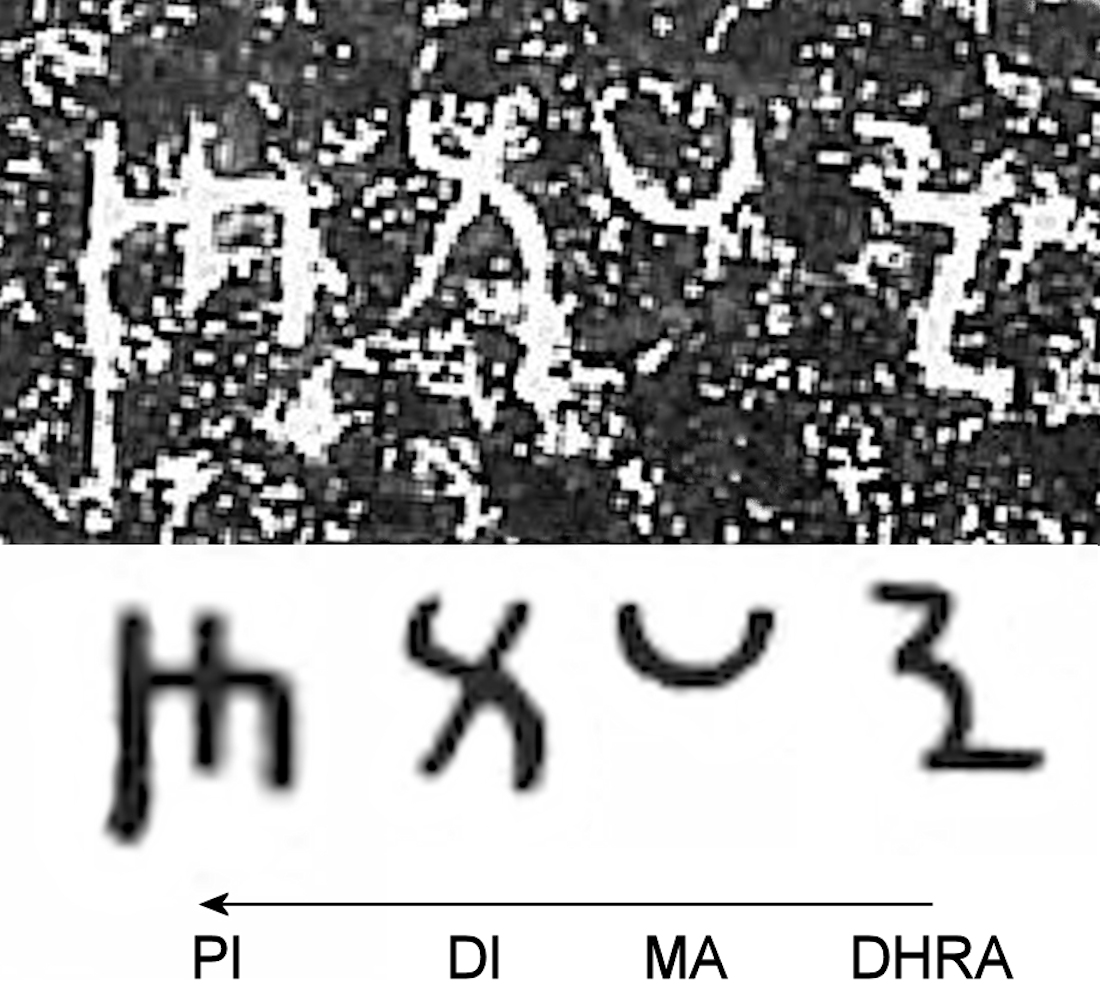
The words inscription of the dharma (Prakrit: 𐨢𐨌𐨨𐨡𐨁𐨤𐨁, romanized: dhrāma dipu) in Edict No. 1 of the Major Rock Edict of Ashoka (circa 250 BCE).

Kharosthi is mostly written right to left. Some variations in both the number and order of syllables occur in extant texts.

The Kharosthi alphabet is also known as the arapacana alphabet, and follows the order.

a ra pa ca na
la da ba ḍa ṣa
va ta ya ṣṭa
ka sa ma ga stha
ja śva dha śa kha
kṣa sta jñā rtha (or ha)
bha cha sma hva tsa
gha ṭha ṇa pha ska
ysa śca ṭa ḍha

This alphabet was used in Gandharan Buddhism as a mnemonic for the Pañcaviṃśatisāhasrikā Prajñāpāramitā Sūtra, a series of verses on the nature of phenomena; this is analogous to the Shiva Sutras of Brahmic scripts. In modern Himalayan and East Asian Buddhism, the first line arapacana is preserved in the mantra of Manjushri, the Bodhisattva of transcendent wisdom.

=== Consonants ===
| | Unvoiced | | Voiced | | Nasal | Semivowel | Sibilant | Fricative |
| | Unaspirated | Aspirated | Unaspirated | Aspirated | Nasal | Semivowel | Sibilant | Fricative |
| Velar | 𐨐 k IPA: /k/ | 𐨑 kh | 𐨒 g IPA: /ɡ/ | 𐨓 gh | | | | 𐨱 h IPA: /h/ |
| Palatal | 𐨕 c IPA: /c/ | 𐨖 ch | 𐨗 j IPA: /ɟ/ | | 𐨙 ñ IPA: /ɲ/ | 𐨩 y IPA: /j/ | 𐨭 ś IPA: /ɕ/ | |
| Retroflex | 𐨚 ṭ IPA: /ʈ/ | 𐨛 ṭh | 𐨜 ḍ IPA: /ɖ/ | 𐨝 ḍh | 𐨞 ṇ IPA: /ɳ/ | 𐨪 r IPA: /r/ | 𐨮 ṣ IPA: /ʂ/ | |
| Dental | 𐨟 t IPA: /t/ | 𐨠 th | 𐨡 d IPA: /d/ | 𐨢 dh | 𐨣 n IPA: /n/ | 𐨫 l | 𐨯 s | 𐨰 z |
| Labial | 𐨤 p IPA: /p/ | 𐨥 ph | 𐨦 b IPA: /b/ | 𐨧 bh | 𐨨 m IPA: /m/ | 𐨬 v | | |
| Other | 𐨲 ḱ | 𐨳 ṭ́h | | | | | | |

A bar above a consonant ⟨𐨸⟩ can be used to indicate various modified pronunciations depending on the consonant, such as nasalization or aspiration. It is used with k, ṣ, g, c, j, n, m, ś, ṣ, s, and h.

The cauda ⟨𐨹⟩ changes how consonants are pronounced in various ways, particularly fricativization. It is used with g, j, ḍ, t, d, p, y, v, ś, and s.

The dot below ⟨𐨺⟩ is used with m and h, but its precise phonetic function is unknown.

=== Vowels and syllables ===
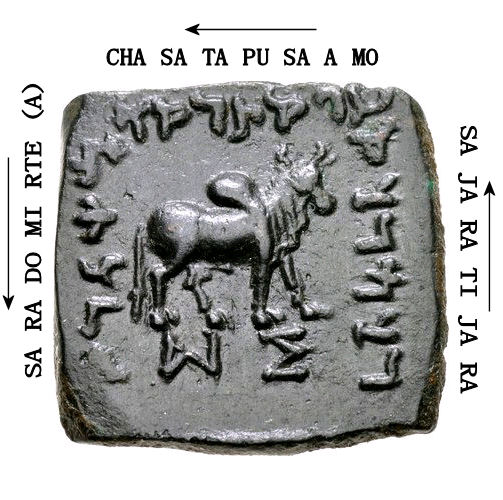
Kharosthi on a coin of Indo-Greek king Artemidoros Aniketos, reading Maues, King of kings and son of Artemidorus, (Gāndhārī: 𐨪𐨗𐨟𐨁𐨪𐨗𐨯𐨨𐨆𐨀𐨯𐨤𐨂𐨟𐨯𐨕𐨪𐨿𐨟𐨅𐨨𐨁𐨡𐨆𐨪𐨯, romanized: Rajatirajasa Moasa putasa cha Artemidorasa).

Kharosthi includes only one standalone vowel character, which is used for initial vowels in words. Other initial vowels use the a character modified by diacritics. Each syllable includes the short /a/ sound by default, with other vowels being indicated by diacritic marks.

Long vowels are marked with the diacritic ⟨𐨌⟩. An anusvara ⟨𐨎⟩ indicates nasalization of the vowel or a nasal segment following the vowel. A visarga ⟨𐨏⟩ indicates the unvoiced syllable-final /h/. It can also be used as a vowel length marker. A further diacritic, the double ring below ⟨𐨍⟩ appears with vowels -a and -u in some Central Asian documents, but its precise phonetic function is unknown.

Salomon has established that the vowel order is /a e i o u/, akin to Semitic scripts, rather than the usual vowel order for Indic scripts /a i u e o/.

Vowels
| | Vowels | | | | | | Other syllable diacritics | |
|---|---|---|---|---|---|---|---|---|
| diacritics | ◌ (Note: There is no diacritic form of this vowel as consonants include an inherent /a/ or /ə/ vowel.) | ◌𐨅 | ◌𐨁 | ◌𐨆 | ◌𐨂 | ◌𐨃 | 𐨎 | 𐨏 |
| short vowels | 𐨀 IPA: /ə/ a | 𐨀𐨅 IPA: /e/ e (Note: The vowels ⟨𐨅⟩ and ⟨𐨁⟩ are written horizontally when combined with ⟨𐨀⟩, ⟨𐨣⟩, or ⟨𐨱⟩) | 𐨀𐨁 IPA: /i/ i | 𐨀𐨆 IPA: /o/ o | 𐨀𐨂 IPA: /u/ u | 𐨀𐨃 IPA: /r̩/ r̥ | 𐨀𐨎 aṃ | 𐨀𐨏 aḥ |
| long vowels | 𐨀𐨌 IPA: /aː/ ā | 𐨀𐨅𐨌 IPA: /ɐi̯/ ai | 𐨀𐨁𐨌 IPA: /iː/ ī | 𐨀𐨆𐨌 IPA: /ɐu̯/ au | 𐨀𐨂𐨌 IPA: /uː/ ū | 𐨀𐨃𐨌 IPA: /r̩ː/ r̥̄ | 𐨀𐨌𐨎 āṃ | 𐨀𐨌𐨏 āḥ |
| examples with ⟨𐨤⟩ | 𐨤 pa | 𐨤𐨅 pe (Note: The vowel ⟨𐨅⟩ is written vertically when combined with ⟨𐨠⟩, ⟨𐨤⟩, ⟨𐨥⟩, or ⟨𐨫⟩) | 𐨤𐨁 pi (Note: The vowel ⟨𐨁⟩ is written as a small vertical stroke when combined with ⟨𐨠⟩, ⟨𐨤⟩, ⟨𐨥⟩, ⟨𐨨⟩, ⟨𐨫⟩, or ⟨𐨭⟩) | 𐨤𐨆 po (Note: The vowel ⟨◌𐨆⟩ is written vertically when combined with ⟨𐨤⟩, ⟨𐨥⟩, ⟨𐨩⟩, or ⟨𐨭⟩) | 𐨤𐨂 pu | 𐨤𐨃 pr̥ | 𐨤𐨎 paṃ | 𐨤𐨏 paḥ |
| examples with ⟨𐨨⟩ | 𐨨 ma | 𐨨𐨅 me | 𐨨𐨁 mi | 𐨨𐨆 mo | 𐨨𐨂 mu (Note: Combining ⟨𐨨 + ◌𐨂⟩ produces this unique ligature, ⟨𐨡 + ◌𐨂⟩ also produces a unique ligature, ⟨𐨡𐨂⟩) | 𐨨𐨃 mr̥ | 𐨨𐨎 maṃ | 𐨨𐨏 maḥ |

== Additional marks ==
Various additional marks are used to modify vowels and consonants:

| Mark | Trans. | Example | Description |
|---|---|---|---|
| 𐨌 | ◌̄ | 𐨨 + 𐨌 → 𐨨𐨌 | The vowel length mark may be used with -a, -i, -u, and -r̥ to indicate the equivalent long vowel (-ā, -ī, -ū, and r̥̄ respectively). When used with -e it indicates the diphthong -ai. When used with -o it indicates the diphthong -au. |
| 𐨍 | ◌͚ | 𐨯 + 𐨍 → 𐨯𐨍 | The vowel modifier double ring below appears in some Central Asian documents with vowels -a and -u. Its precise phonetic function is unknown. |
| 𐨎 | ṃ | 𐨀 + 𐨎 → 𐨀𐨎 | An anusvara indicates nasalization of the vowel or a nasal segment following the vowel. It can be used with -a, -i, -u, -r̥, -e, and -o. |
| 𐨏 | ḥ | 𐨐 + 𐨏 → 𐨐𐨏 | A visarga indicates the unvoiced syllable-final /h/. It can also be used as a vowel length marker. Visarga is used with -a, -i, -u, -r̥, -e, and -o. |
| 𐨸 | ◌̄ | 𐨗 + 𐨸 → 𐨗𐨸 | A bar above a consonant can be used to indicate various modified pronunciations depending on the consonant, such as nasalization or aspiration. It is used with k, ṣ, g, c, j, n, m, ś, ṣ, s, and h. |
| 𐨹 | ◌́ or ◌̱ | 𐨒 + 𐨹 → 𐨒𐨹 | The cauda changes how consonants are pronounced in various ways, particularly fricativization. It is used with g, j, ḍ, t, d, p, y, v, ś, and s. |
| 𐨺 | ◌̣ | 𐨨 + 𐨺 → 𐨨𐨺 | The precise phonetic function of the dot below is unknown. It is used with m and h. |
| 𐨿 | (n/a) | | A virama is used to suppress the inherent vowel that otherwise occurs with every consonant letter. Its effect varies based on situation: |
| 𐨿 | (n/a) | 𐨢 + 𐨁 + 𐨐 + 𐨿 → 𐨢𐨁𐨐𐨿 | When not followed by a consonant the virama causes the preceding consonant to be written as a subscript to the left of the letter before that consonant. |
| 𐨿 | (n/a) | 𐨐 + 𐨿 + 𐨮 → 𐨐𐨿𐨮 | When the virama is followed by another consonant, it will trigger a combined form consisting of two or more consonants. This may be a ligature, a special combining form, or a combining full form depending on the consonants involved. The result takes into account any other combining marks. |
| 𐨿 | (n/a) | 𐨯 + 𐨿 + 𐨩 → 𐨯𐨿𐨩 | When the virama is followed by another consonant, it will trigger a combined form consisting of two or more consonants. This may be a ligature, a special combining form, or a combining full form depending on the consonants involved. The result takes into account any other combining marks. |
| 𐨿 | (n/a) | 𐨐 + 𐨿 + 𐨟 → 𐨐𐨿𐨟 | When the virama is followed by another consonant, it will trigger a combined form consisting of two or more consonants. This may be a ligature, a special combining form, or a combining full form depending on the consonants involved. The result takes into account any other combining marks. |

== Punctuation ==
Nine Kharosthi punctuation marks have been identified:

| 𐩐 dot | 𐩓 crescent bar | 𐩖 danda | 𐩑 small circle | 𐩔 mangalam | 𐩗 double danda | 𐩒 circle | 𐩕 lotus | 𐩘 lines |

== Numerals ==
Kharosthi included a set of numerals that are reminiscent of Roman numerals and Psalter Pahlavi Numerals. The system is based on an additive and a multiplicative principle, but does not have the subtractive feature used in the Roman numeral system.

Numerals
| 𐩀 1 | 𐩁 2 | 𐩂 3 | 𐩃 4 | 𐩄 10 | 𐩅 20 | 𐩆 100 | 𐩇 1000 |

The numerals, like the letters, are written from right to left. There is no zero and no separate signs for the digits 5–9. Numbers are written additively, so, for example, the number 1996 would be written as 𐩇𐩃𐩃𐩀𐩆𐩅𐩅𐩅𐩅𐩄𐩃𐩁.

𐩅𐩅𐩅𐩅𐩄𐩃𐩁 𐩃𐩃𐩀𐩆 𐩇
(2+4+10+20+20+20+20) + 100x(1+4+4) + 1000

== Unicode ==
Kharosthi was added to the Unicode Standard in March 2005 with the release of version 4.1.

The Unicode block for Kharosthi is U+10A00–U+10A5F:

Kharoshthi^{[1]}^{[2]} Official Unicode Consortium code chart (PDF)
| | 0 | 1 | 2 | 3 | 4 | 5 | 6 | 7 | 8 | 9 | A | B | C | D | E | F |
| U+10A0x | 𐨀 | 𐨁 | 𐨂 | 𐨃 | | 𐨅 | 𐨆 | | | | | | 𐨌 | 𐨍 | 𐨎 | 𐨏 |
| U+10A1x | 𐨐 | 𐨑 | 𐨒 | 𐨓 | | 𐨕 | 𐨖 | 𐨗 | | 𐨙 | 𐨚 | 𐨛 | 𐨜 | 𐨝 | 𐨞 | 𐨟 |
| U+10A2x | 𐨠 | 𐨡 | 𐨢 | 𐨣 | 𐨤 | 𐨥 | 𐨦 | 𐨧 | 𐨨 | 𐨩 | 𐨪 | 𐨫 | 𐨬 | 𐨭 | 𐨮 | 𐨯 |
| U+10A3x | 𐨰 | 𐨱 | 𐨲 | 𐨳 | 𐨴 | 𐨵 | | | 𐨸 | 𐨹 | 𐨺 | | | | | 𐨿 |
| U+10A4x | 𐩀 | 𐩁 | 𐩂 | 𐩃 | 𐩄 | 𐩅 | 𐩆 | 𐩇 | 𐩈 | | | | | | | |
| U+10A5x | 𐩐 | 𐩑 | 𐩒 | 𐩓 | 𐩔 | 𐩕 | 𐩖 | 𐩗 | 𐩘 | | | | | | | |
Notes 1.As of Unicode version 18.0 2.Grey areas indicate non-assigned code points

== Gallery ==
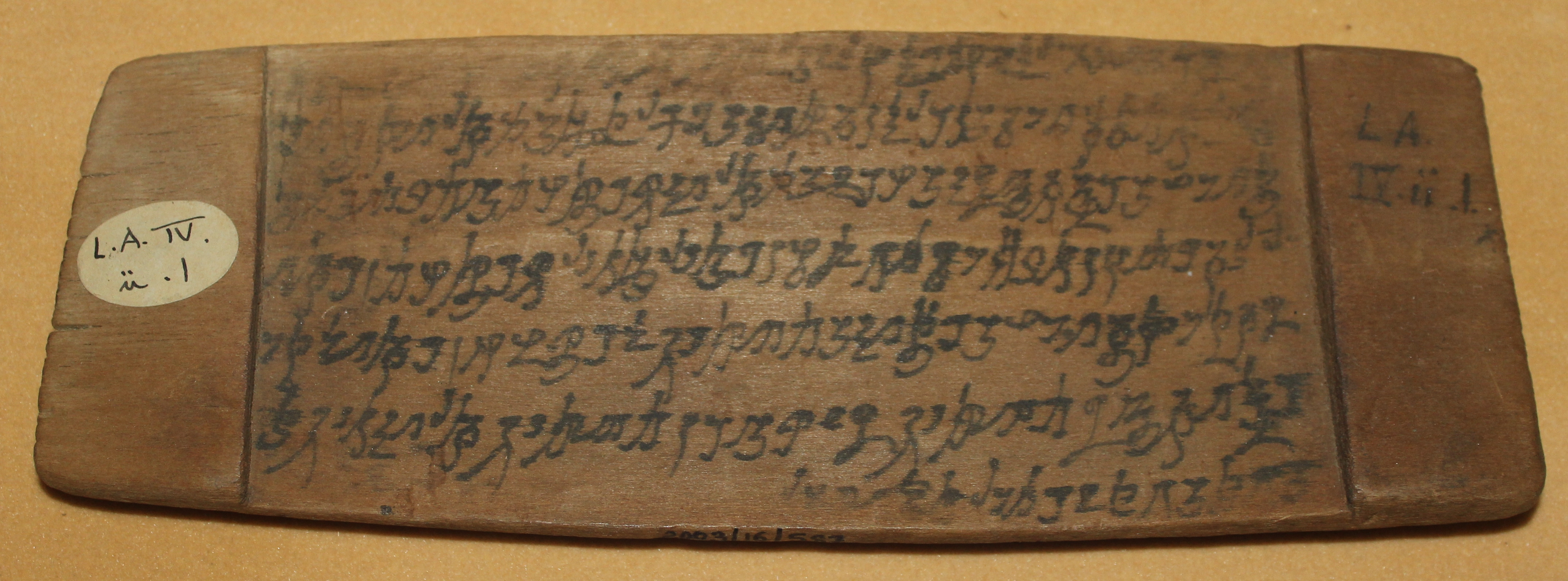
Kharosthi script on a wooden plate in the National Museum of India in New Delhi

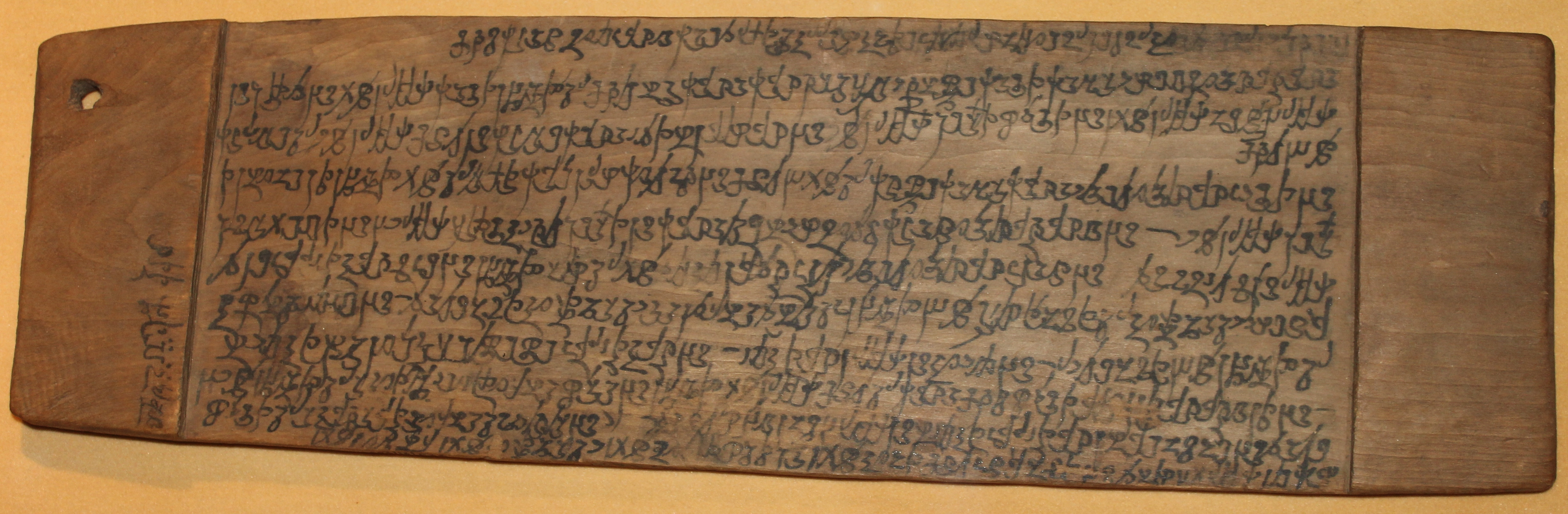
Kharosthi script on a wooden plate in the National Museum of India in New Delhi

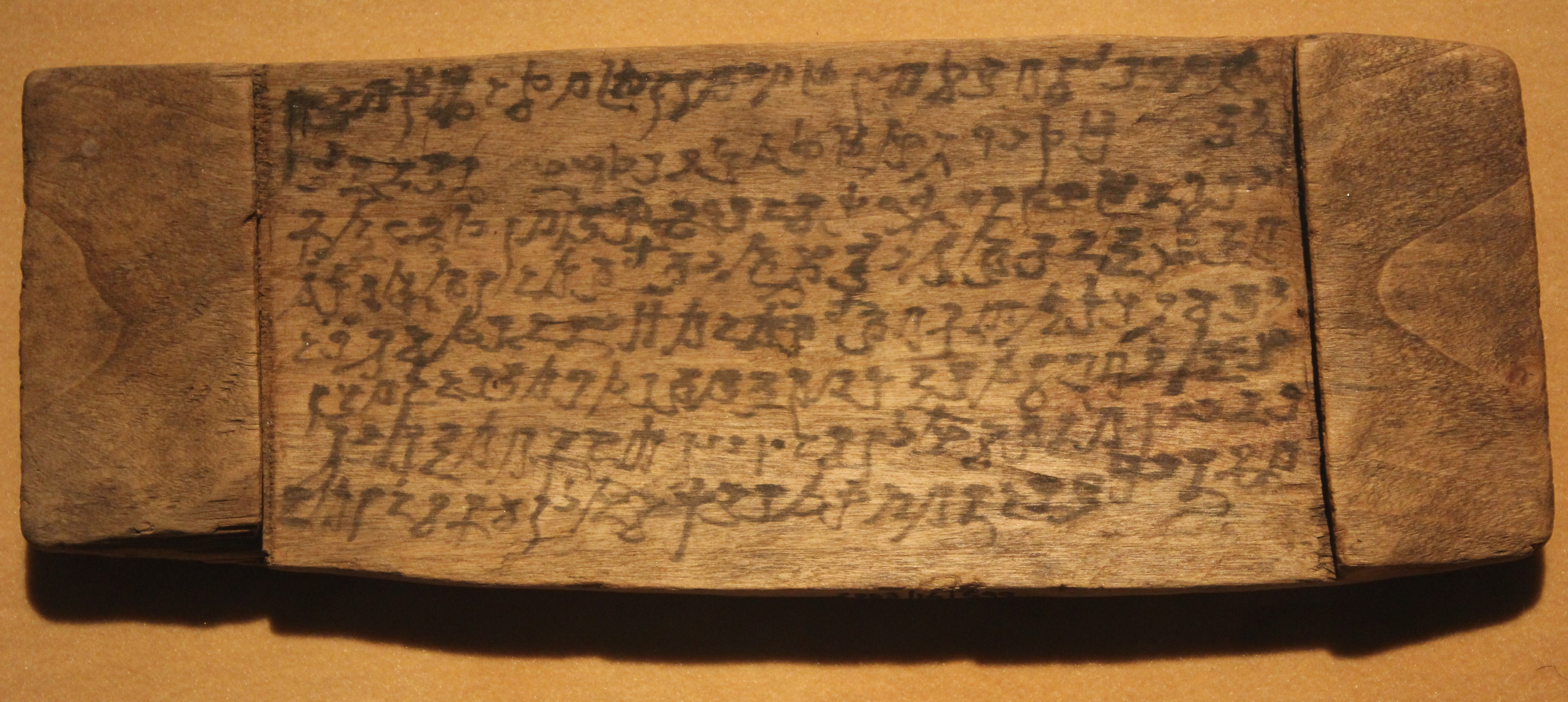
Kharosthi script on a wooden plate in the National Museum of India in New Delhi

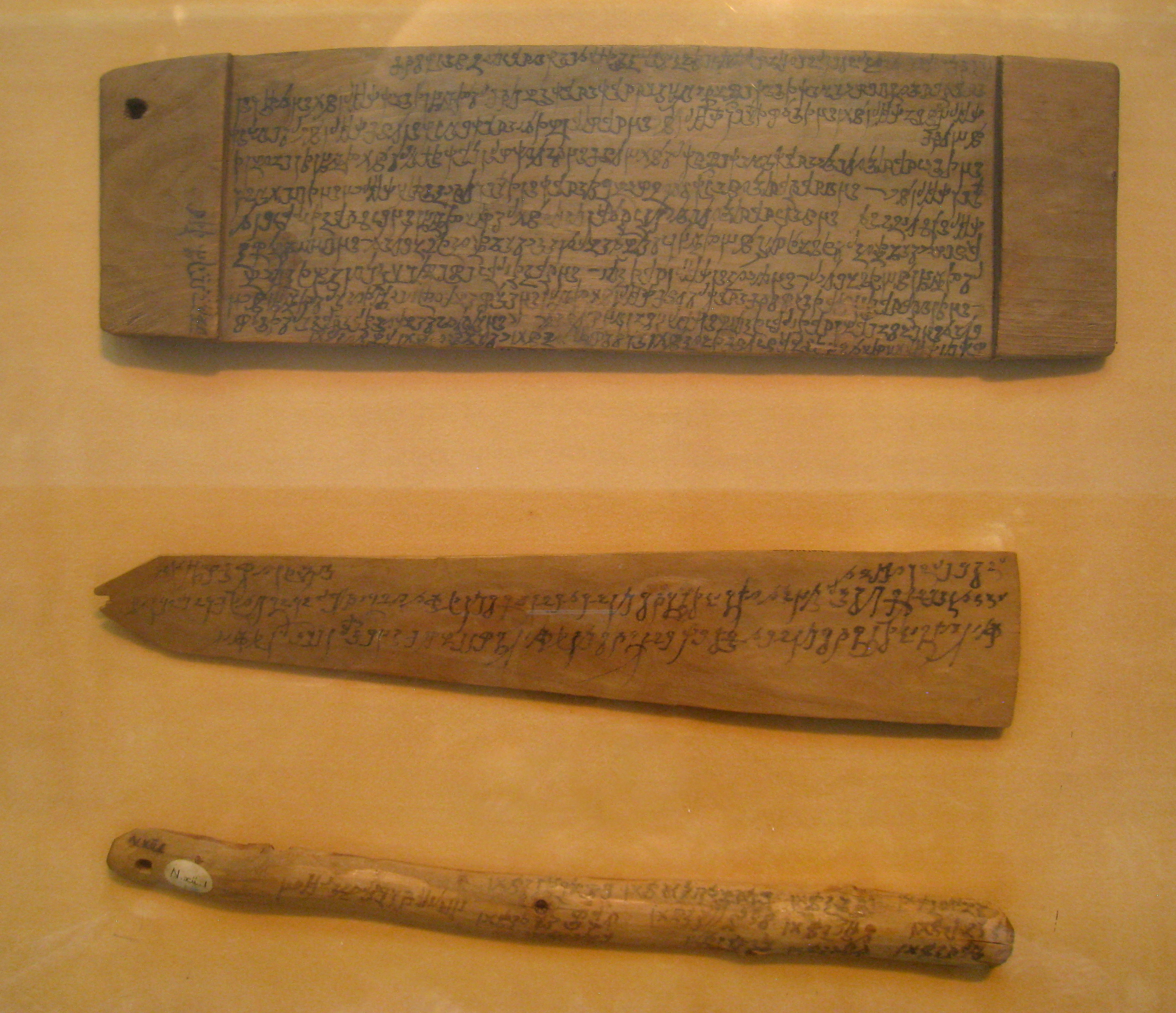
Kharosthi script on wood from Niya, 3rd century CE

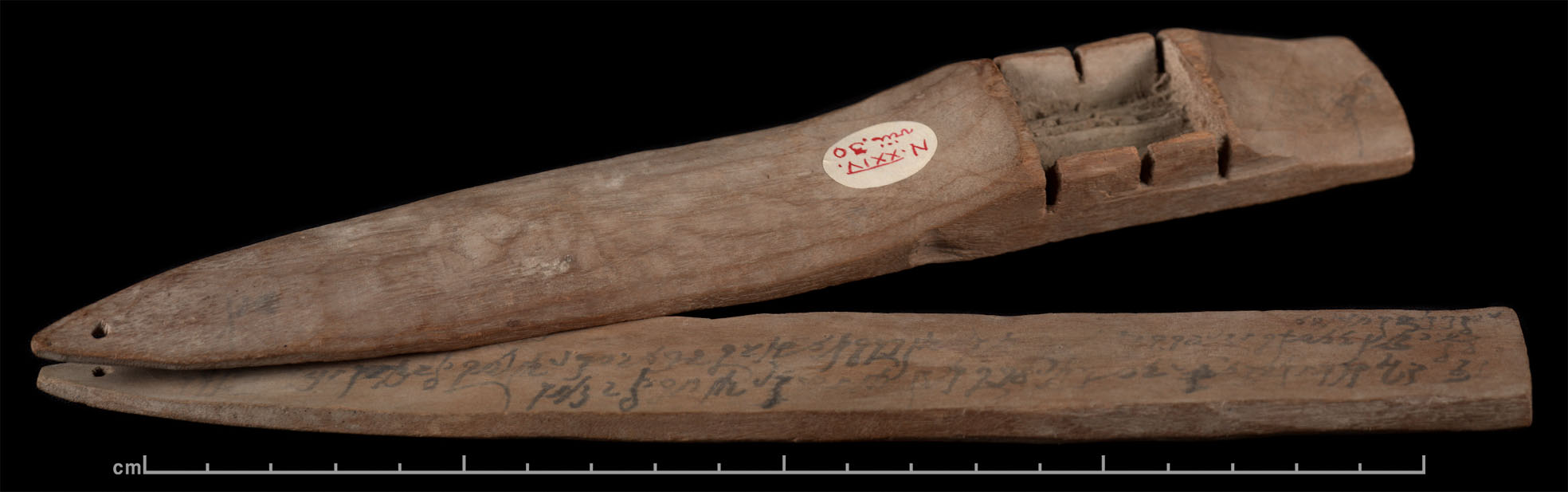
Double-wedged wooden tablet in Gandhari written in Kharosthi script, 2nd to 4th century CE

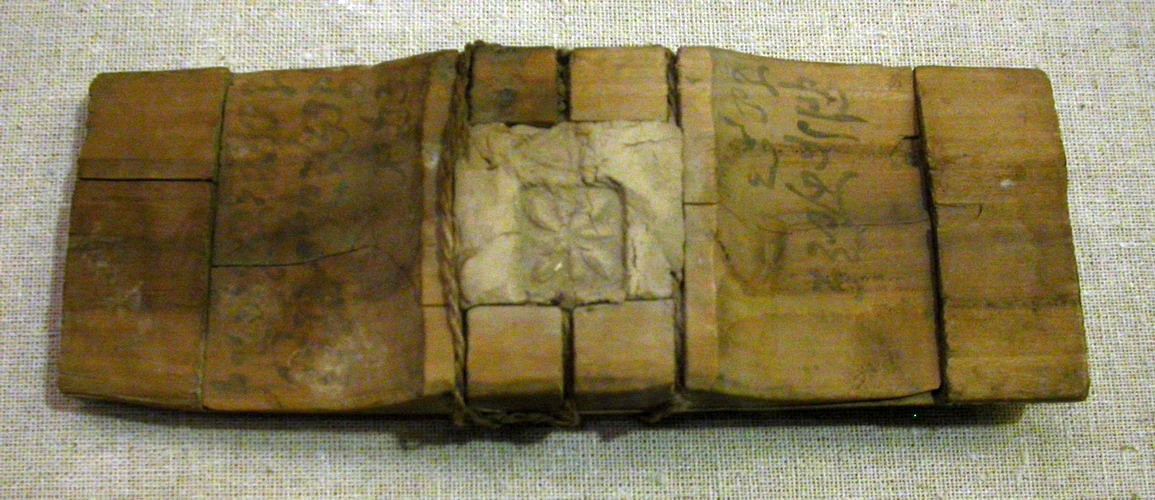
Wooden tablet inscribed with Kharosthi characters (2nd–3rd century CE). Excavated at the Niya ruins in Xinjiang, China. Collection of the Xinjiang Museum.

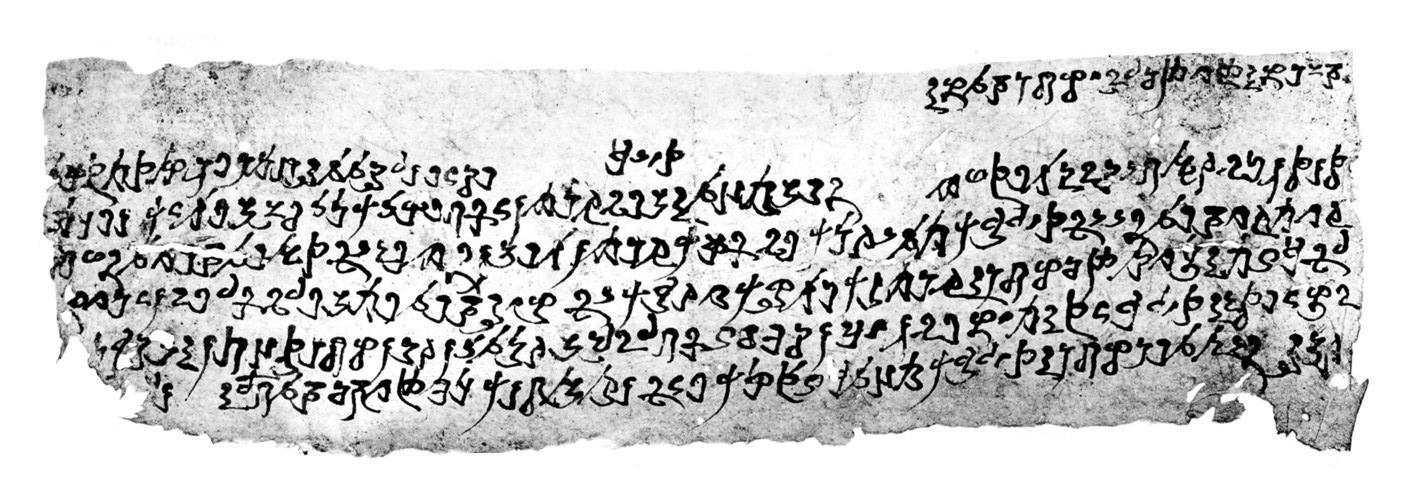
Wooden Kharosthi document found at Loulan, China by Aurel Stein

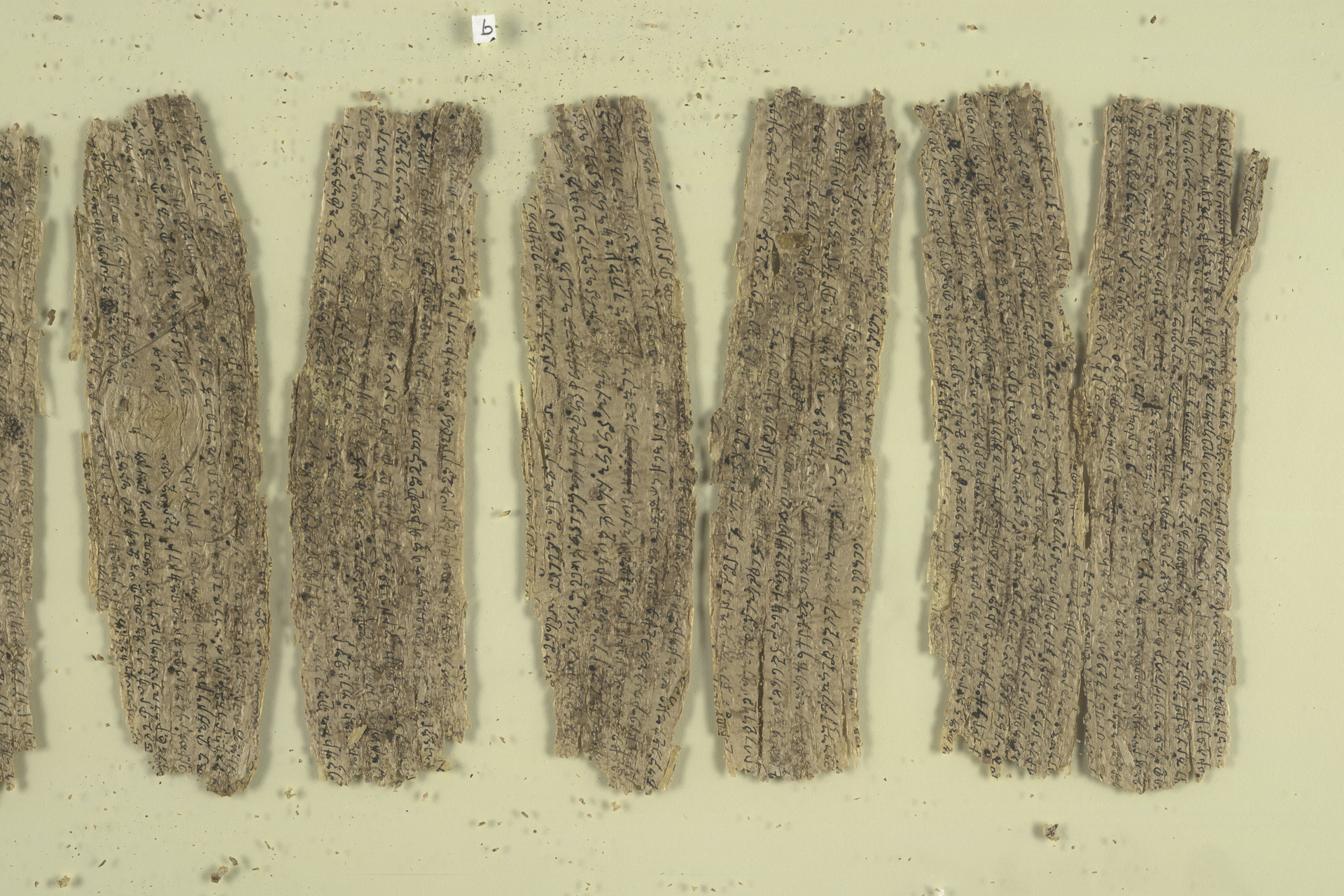
Fragmentary Kharosthi Buddhist text on birchbark (Part of a group of early manuscripts from Gandhara), first half of 1st century CE. Collection of the British Library in London

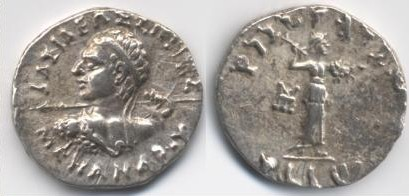
Silver bilingual tetradrachm of Menander I (155-130 BCE). Obverse: Greek legend, ΒΑΣΙΛΕΩΣ ΣΩΤΗΡΟΣ ΜΕΝΑΝΔΡΟΥ (BASILEOS SOTEROS MENANDROU), literally, "Of Saviour King Menander". Reverse: Kharosthi legend: MAHARAJA TRATARASA MENADRASA "Saviour King Menander". Athena advancing right, with thunderbolt and shield. Taxila mint mark.

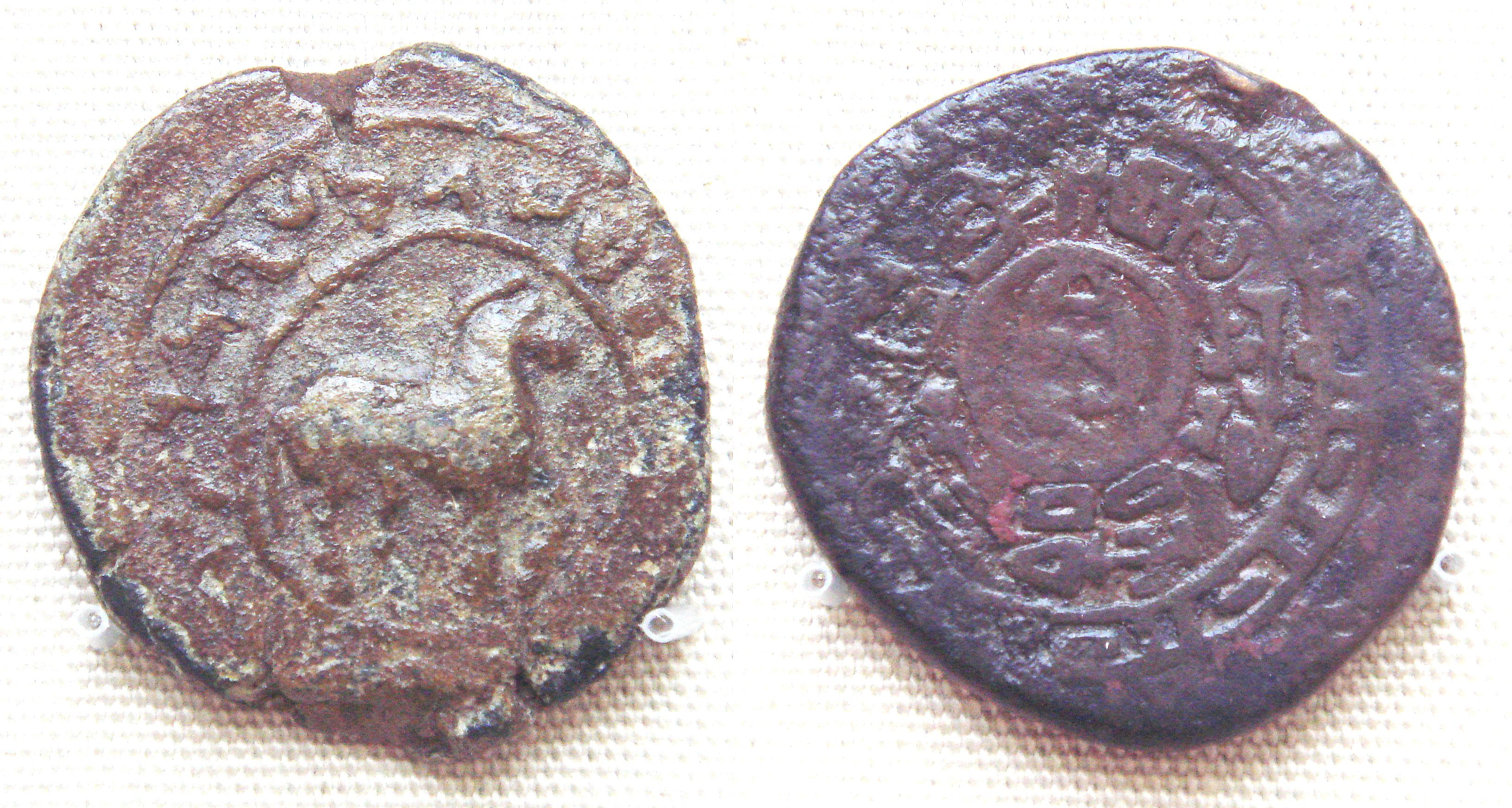
Coin of King Gurgamoya of Khotan (1st century CE). Obverse: Kharosthi legend "Of the great king of kings, king of Khotan, Gurgamoya. Reverse: Chinese legend: "Twenty-four grain copper coin".

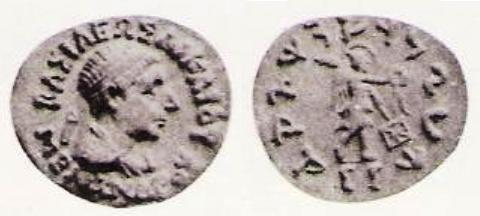
Coin of Menander II Dikaiou Obverse: Menander wearing a diadem. Greek legend: ΒΑΣΙΛΕΩΣ ΔΙΚΑΙΟΥ ΜΕΝΑΝΔΡΟΥ "King Menander the Just". Reverse: Winged figure bearing diadem and palm, with halo, probably Nike. The Kharosthi legend reads MAHARAJASA DHARMIKASA MENADRASA "Great King, Menander, follower of the Dharma, Menander".

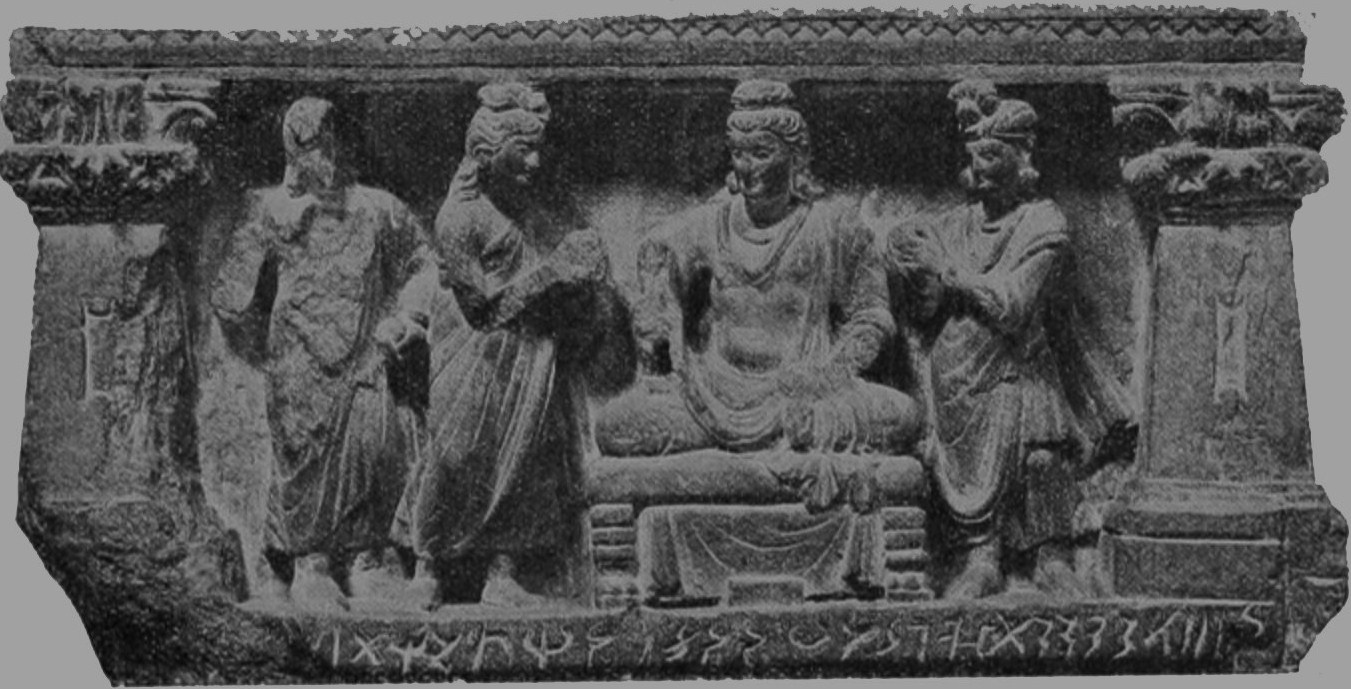
The Indo-Greek Hashtnagar Pedestal symbolizes bodhisattva and ancient Kharosthi script. Found near Rajar in Gandhara, Pakistan. Exhibited at the British Museum in London.

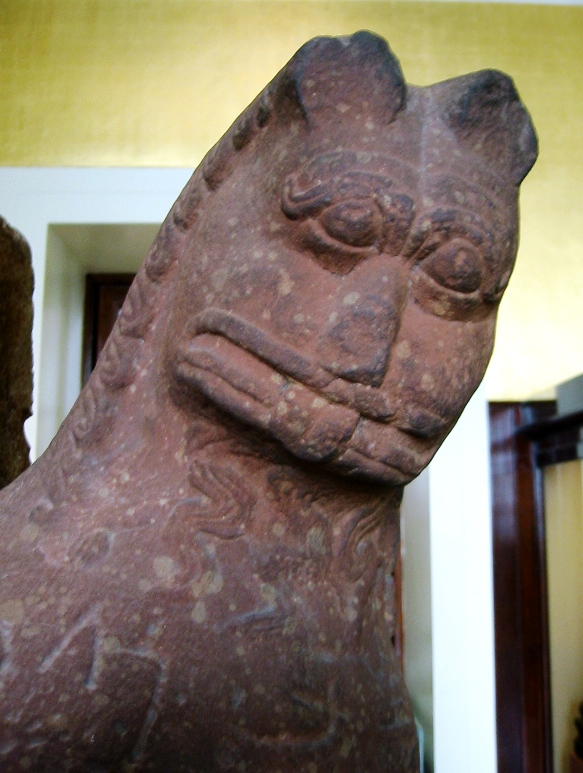
Mathura lion capital with addorsed lions and Prakrit inscriptions in Kharosthi script

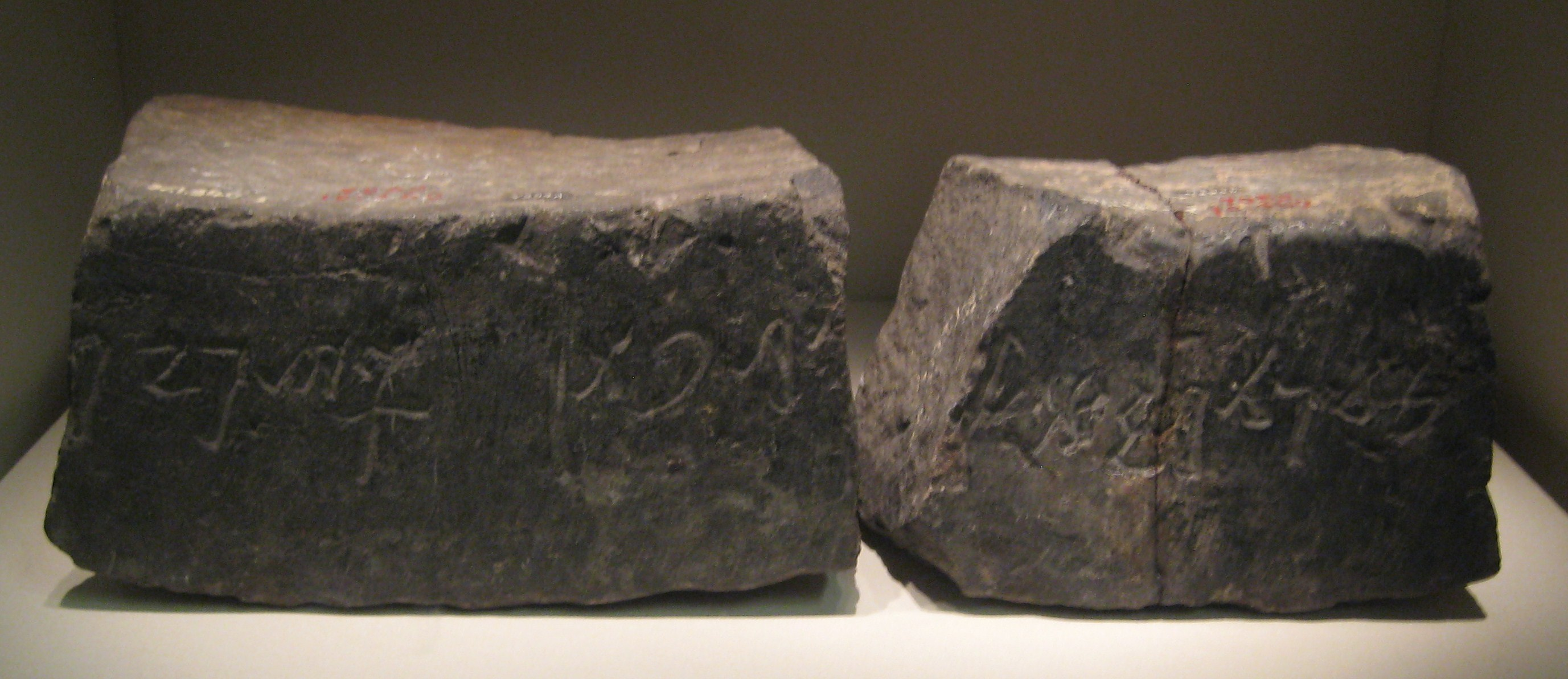
Fragments of stone well railings with a Buddhist inscription written in Kharosthi script (late Han period to the Three Kingdoms era). Discovered at Luoyang, China in 1924.

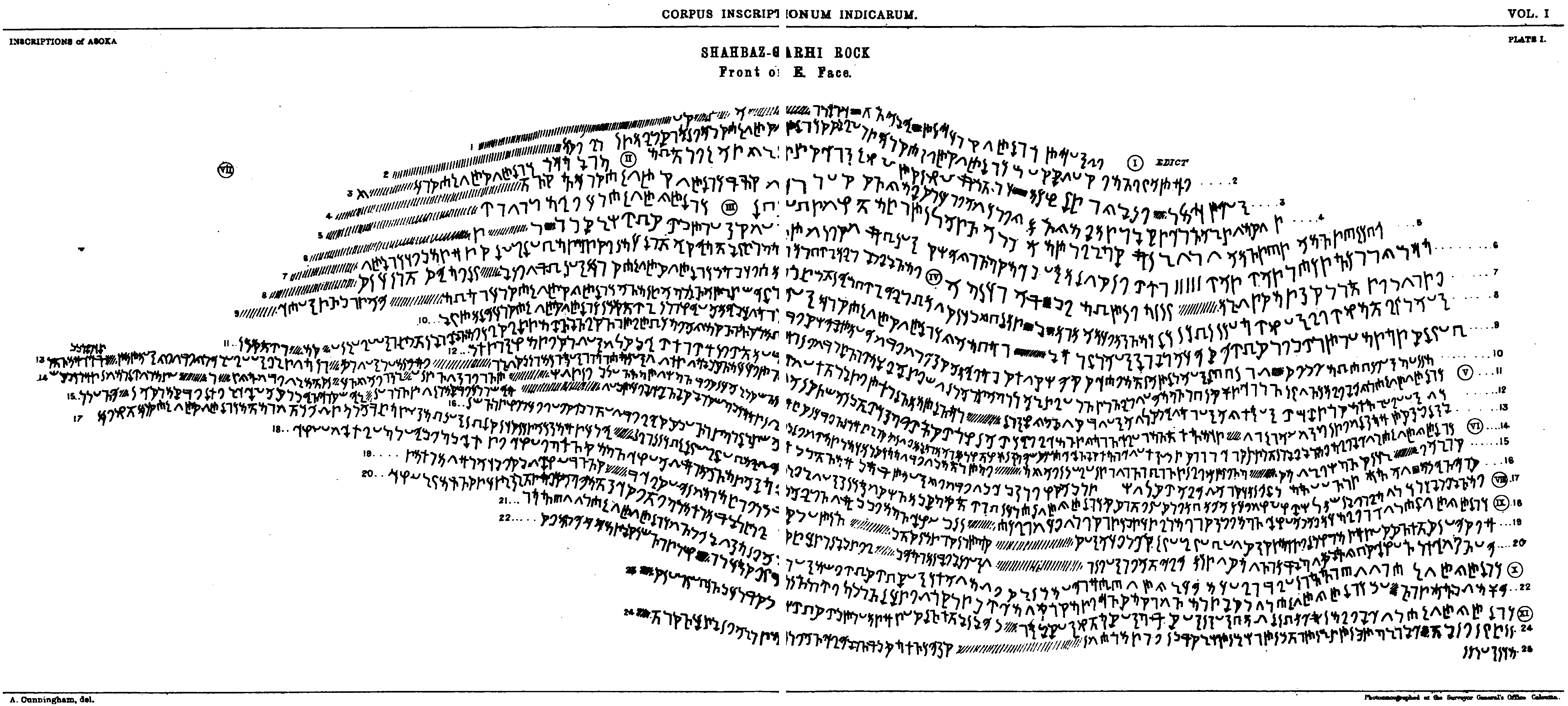
Portion of Emperor Ashoka's Rock Edicts at Shahbaz Garhi

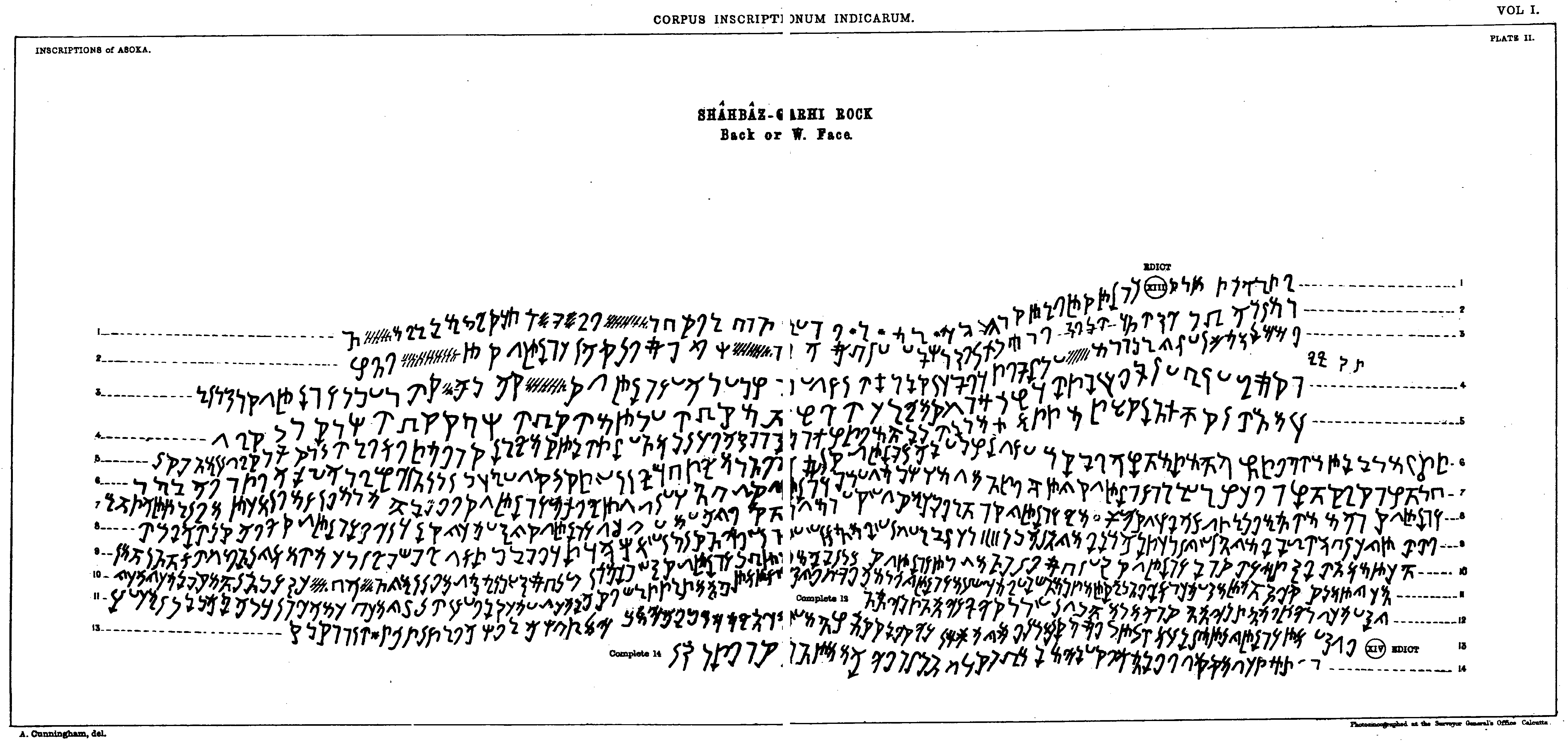
Portion of Emperor Ashoka's Rock Edicts at Shahbaz Garhi

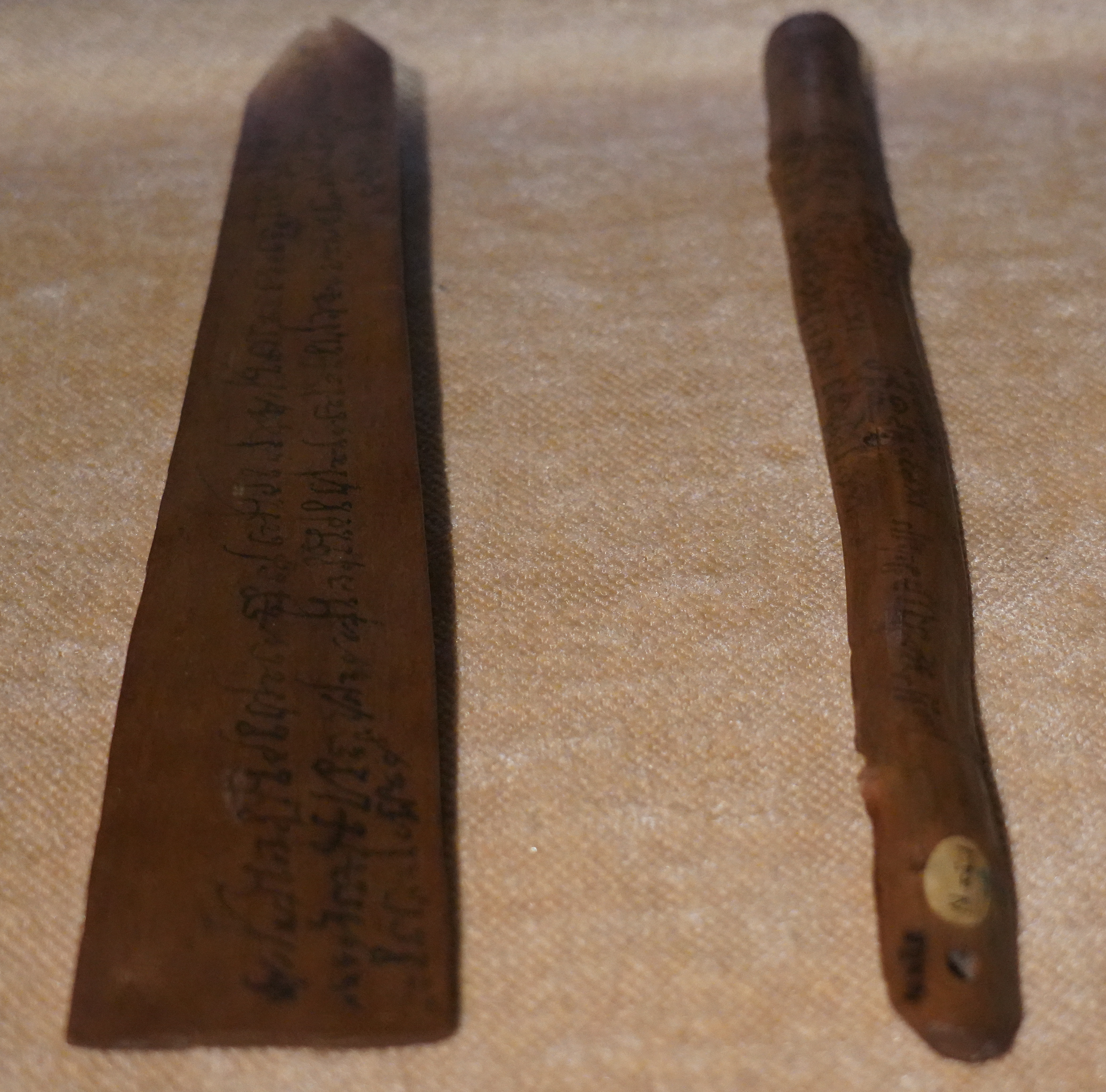
Document on wooden stick written in Kharosthi script, 3rd-4th century CE.

== See also ==
- Brahmi
- History of Afghanistan
- History of Pakistan
- Pre-Islamic scripts in Afghanistan
