= Gurgamoya =

1st-century king of Khotan

- King of Khotan
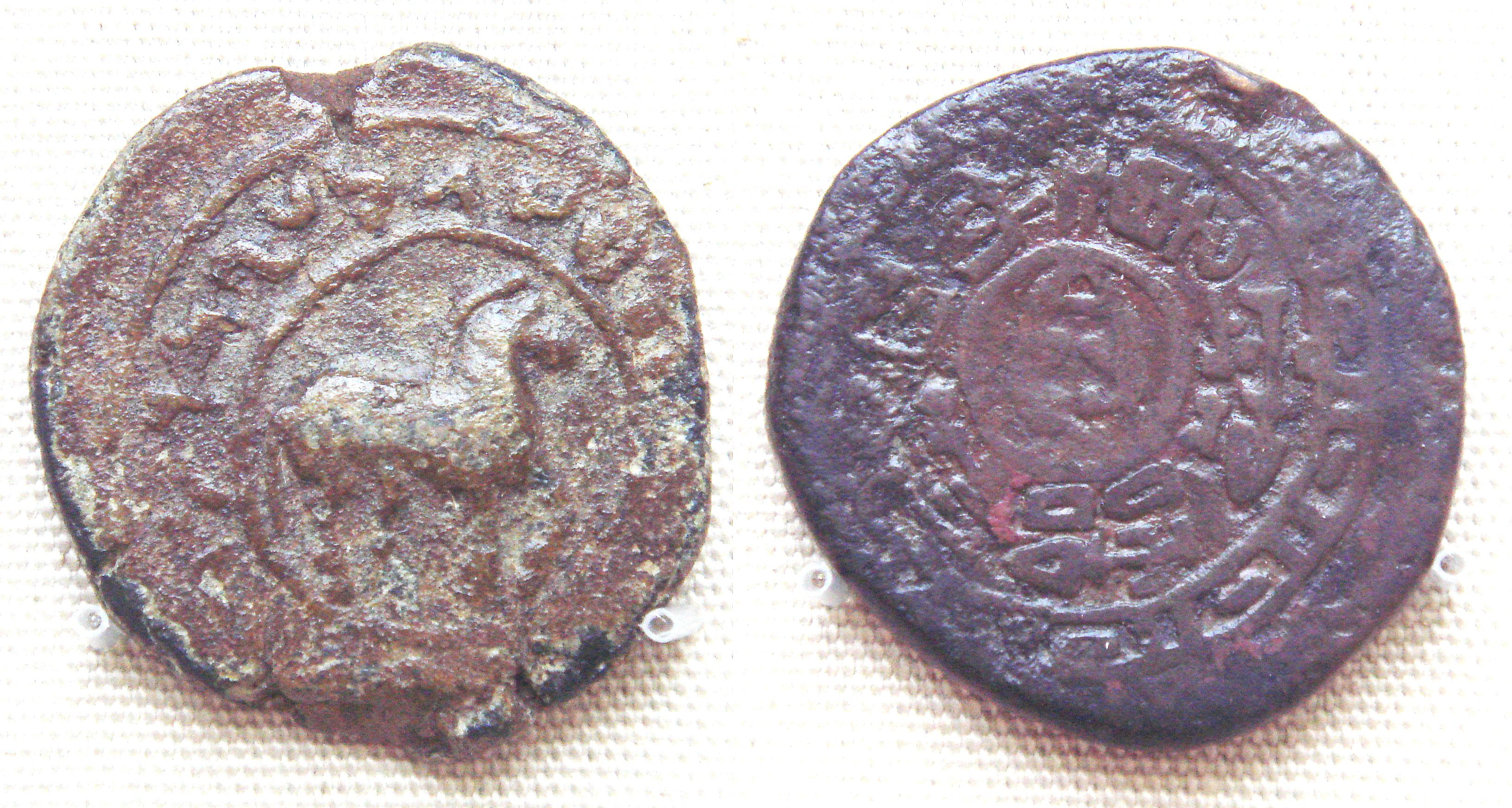
- Kharoshthi legend "Of the great king of kings, king of Khotan, Gurgamoya. Chinese legend: "Twenty-four grain copper coin".

King of Kingdom of Khotan
- Reign: 30–60 CE
- Predecessor: Jun De
- Successor: Xiu Moba
- Died: 60 CE
- Issue: Xiu Moba
- Father: Jun De
- Religion: Khotanese Buddhism

Gurgamoya (Kharosthi: 𐨒𐨂𐨪𐨿𐨒𐨨𐨆𐨩 Gu-rga-mo-ya, Gurgamoya) was a king of the Kingdom of Khotan in the 1st century CE.

== Reign ==
His coins were usually made of bronze and included legends in Kharosthi and Chinese. The Kharoshthi describes the title of the king, while the Chinese give the weight of the coin. The Kharoshti points to relations with northern India, which at that time was ruled by the Kushan Empire, with its powerful ruler Kujula Kadphises, who was also known by the Chinese. Gurgamoya is thought to have ruled circa 30-60 CE.

== Coins ==
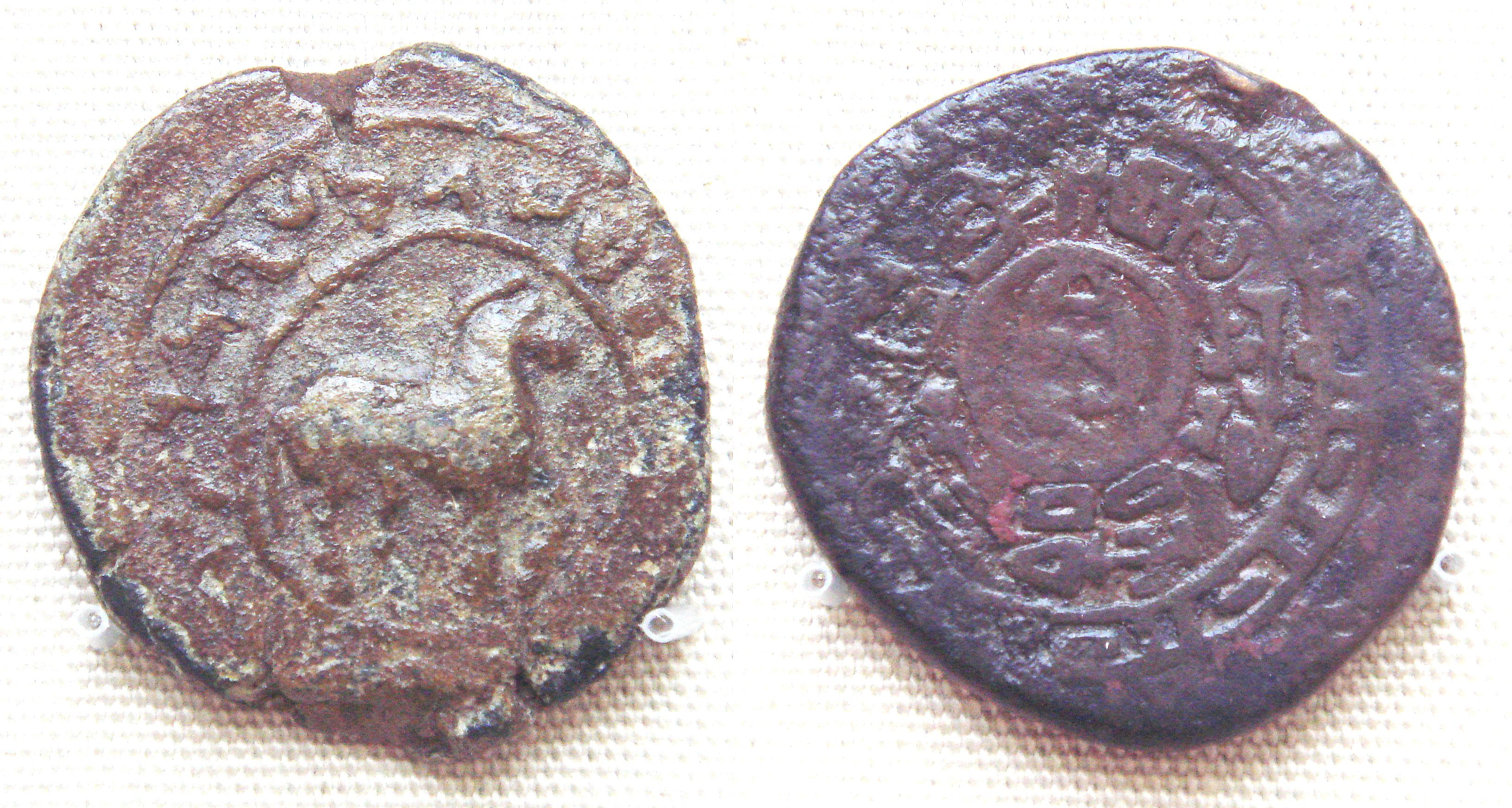
Coin of Gurgamoya, king of Khotan. Khotan, 1st century CE.
Obv: Kharoshthi legend "Of the great king of kings, king of Khotan, Gurgamoya.
Rev: Chinese legend: "Twenty-four grain copper coin".

Copper coin of the Tarim Basin, area of Hotan, 1st-2nd century CE.
Obv:: Chinese characters: LUH (六) TCHU TSIEN "Six tchu (of) money"
Rev:: Depiction of a horse. Prakrit legend in Kharoshthi script: GUGRAMAYA.

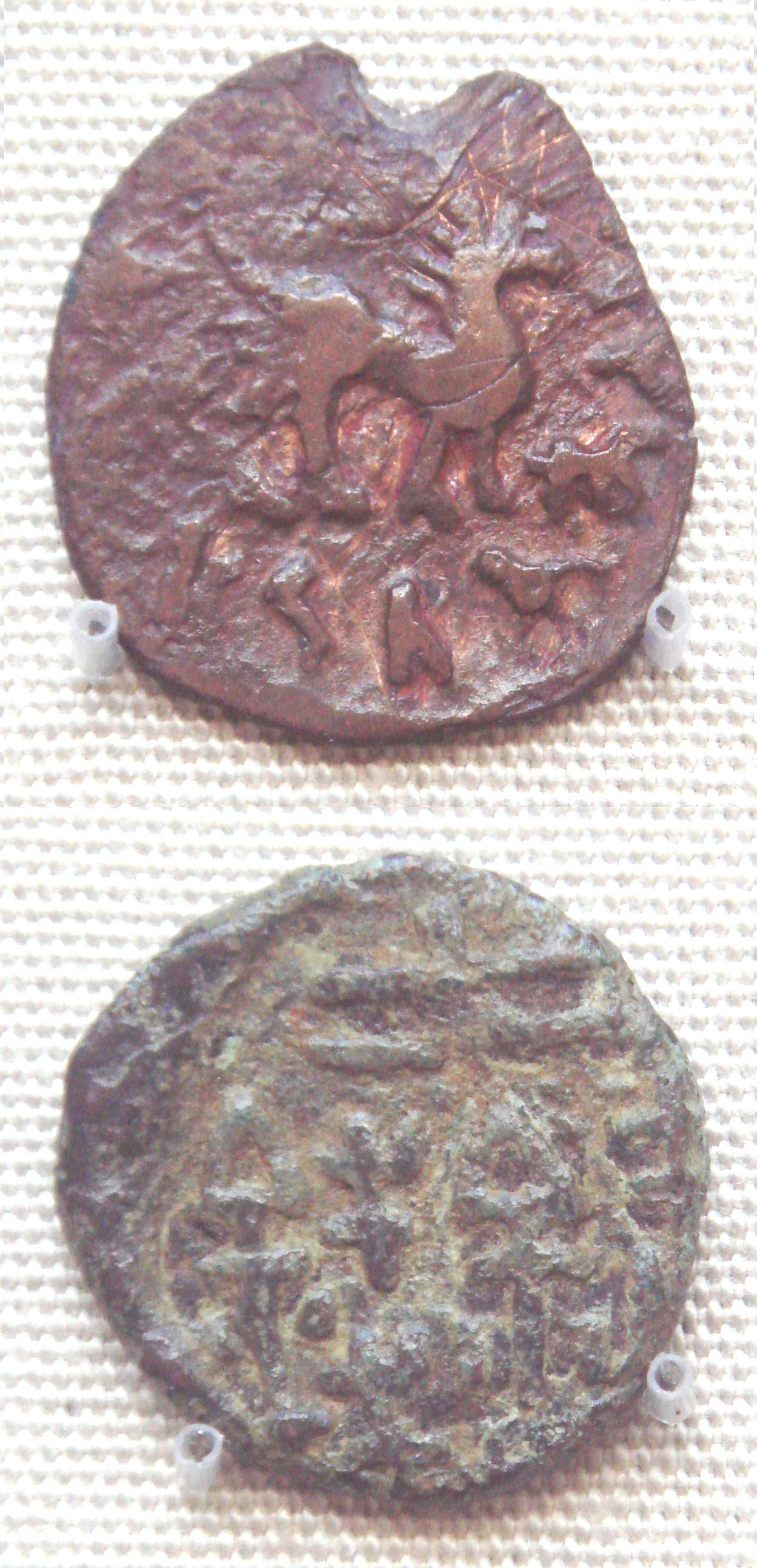
Gurgamoya coin. Obverse in Kharoshthi: "Of the great king king of Khotan Gurgamoya". Reverse in Chinese: "6 grains coin".
