= Śīladharma =

Śīladharma was a ninth-century Buddhist monk and translator from the Kingdom of Khotan. Śīladharma was mainly active in the Western territories of Tang China where he stayed in Longxingsi monastery, now situated in Inner Mongolia. Śīladharma was familiar with multiple languages and worked to translate Buddhist texts from Sanskrit to Mandarin but also from Mandarin to Tibetan.

One of the main sources of information regarding Śīladharma's life is the sixth-century text, the Memoirs of Eminent Monks by Hui Jiao which was a compilation of the lives of notable monks who were active in China. Other than detailing his Khotanese origins, it also detailed how while staying at Longxingsi, he translated two Buddhist sutras that had been brought to China from India by the monk Wu Kong. These have been identified as the Daśabhūmika Sūtra and the Pariṇāmacakrasūtra and the process of translation took approximately four years starting in 785 CE and ending in 789 CE. Śīladharma then presented his translations to the Tang Emperor in Chang'an after which he returned to Khotan.

The Tibetan Bka' 'gyur also records two translations made by Śīladharma. This was probably during the period when Khotan became a subject of the Tibetan Empire after 798 CE when the King of Khotan, Vijaya Vāhana, was demoted to a mere governor of Khotan. These texts have been identified as the Pariṇāmacakrasūtra and the Samādhicakrasutra.
