= Viśa' Śūra =

- King of Khotan
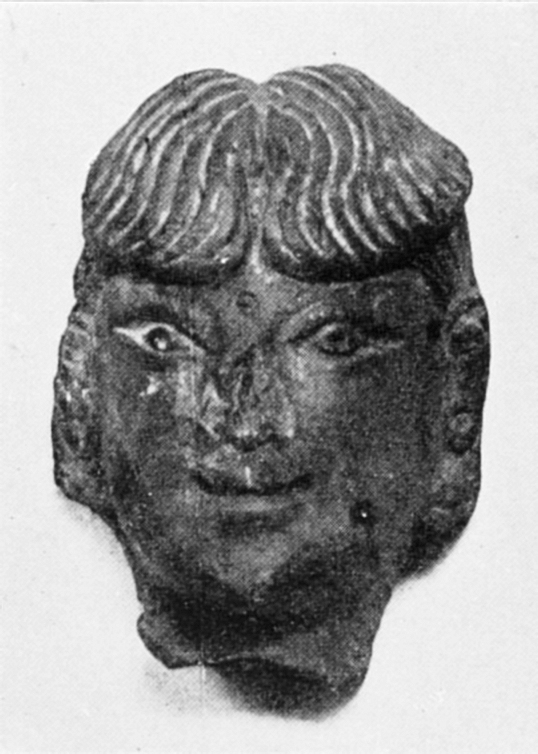
- Head of a Khotan King, 10th century. with the characteristic style of the caftan-wearing "Tocharian"

King of Kingdom of Khotan
- Reign: 966–977
- Predecessor: Viśa' Saṃbhava
- Successor: Viśa' Dharma
- Died: 977
- Issue: Viśa' Dharma
- Father: Viśa' Saṃbhava
- Mother: Queen Cao
- Religion: Khotanese Buddhism

Viśa' Śūra (Chinese: 尉遲輸羅), Sinicized name Li Congde (李从德), was king of Khotan from 966 to 977. He was the son of Viśa' Saṃbhava. He adopted Tianzun (天尊) as the era name of his reign.

== Reign ==
Viśa' Śūra began his campaign about 970 and conquered many of the settlements in the Shule region, which was the capital of the Karakhanid Khanate. His victorious campaign yielded great spoils: many prisoners, lots of gold, fabric of silk, and elephants! In 971, in the fourth year of the reign of Emperor Taizu of Song's Kaibao era, a monk from Khotan by the name of Jixiang traveled to the Song court, telling of how he had conquered the Shule Kingdom and acquired a performing elephant.
