= Wukong (monk) =

Tang Dynasty Buddhist Monk

- Born: 730 CE; Yunyang (蕓陽), in the district of Chang'an, China
- Died: after 790 CE; Chang'an, China
- Occupations: Buddhist monk, translator, writer

Wukong
- Traditional Chinese: 梧空
- Simplified Chinese: 梧空
Transcriptions
Standard Mandarin
- Hanyu Pinyin: Wukong
- Wade–Giles: Wu-k'ung

Wukong (Chinese: 梧空; pinyin: Wú kōng; Wade–Giles: Wu²-k'ung¹; EFEO: Ou-k'ong; 730 to after 790 CE) was a Chinese Buddhist monk, translator, and writer during the medieval Tang dynasty. His earlier religious name was Fajie (Chinese: 法界) (Sanskrit: Dharmadhātu = 'Realm of the Dharma’.) His family name was Ju (Chinese: 車; pinyin: Jū; Wade–Giles: Chü¹ and his personal name was Che Fengzhao. He was descended from the 拓跋 (Tuoba) clan of the Xianbei - the Northern Wei dynasty which ruled China from 365 to 534 CE.

== To Central Asia and India ==
In 750 CE an embassy from the Kingdom of Jibin/Kāpīśi (罽賓國) in the north-east of modern Afghanistan, and adjoining Pakistan, arrived in the Chang'an asking for an alliance with Tang China. Emperor Xuanzong (ruled 712 to 756) sent an official, Zhang Taoguang, with about forty men including Che Fengzhao (later Wukong) to go to Jibin and Wukong accompanied them from the capital, Chang'an, in 751.

The party followed the route taken by a Chinese army under General Gao Xianzhi in 747 from Kashgar. The route, as described in the biography of Wukong, is of great geographical and historical interest. From Kashgar (Sulei) they crossed the Pamir Mountains (Congshan, literally, 'Onion Mountains') to Shighnan ('the kingdom of the five Chini'), on to Wakhan (Humi) and Yasin (Juwei), then through two small unidentified states (Helan and Lansuo) to Gilgit (Yehe) and then Uddiyana in the Swat valley (Wuzhangna or Wuchang) through two more unidentified kingdoms and the unidentified "Indus city" (Sindu) near the Indus River (Sindu). On 15 March 753 they finally reached Gandhara (Qiantuoluo), which is said to have been the eastern capital of Jibin. The king lived here in the winter to avoid the cold, and during the summer in Jibin itself to avoid the heat. After arriving in Gandhara, Wukong became very sick and so he stayed in the kingdom and did not return to China with the ambassador.

== Jibin and India ==
After the return of the ambassador, he consecrated his life to the Buddha and was ordained in Jibin in 757. This is when he was given his religious name of Dharmadhātu in Sanskrit or Fajie in Chinese. He stayed in Gandhara for four years. For two years he studied and practised the Vinaya of the Mulasarvastivada branch of Buddhism in Kashmir under the direction of three masters. While in Kashmir he studied at the Mengdi monastery which Sten Konow identified as being located in the village of Uskar (Hușkapura), which is in western Kashmir on the main road to Gandhara, near the modern border with Pakistan. Joshi suggests that it may be identical with the Rāja-vihāra built by King Lalitaditya Muktapida (r. 724–760), the most powerful ruler of the Karkoṭa Empire of Kashmir.

Then, in 764 he headed south to Middle India where he visited Kapilavastu, Varanasi, Vaisali, Devavatara (Kapitha), Sravasti, and Kusinagara, and then lived for three years in the monastery at Nalanda before returning to Gandhara where he stayed in various monasteries and visited all the sacred places.

== Return to China ==
In Gandhara he asked his master if he could return to his homeland who first refused, but finally allowed him to go. He was given several sutras in Sanskrit and a tooth relic of the Buddha to take back to his sovereign. He first headed through Tokharistan and, after a number of adventures, reached Kashgar. From there, he travelled to Khotan where he stayed for six months and went on to Kucha, where he stayed for more than a year. From there he went to Karashahr, where he stayed three months before heading on to Beiting (Urumqi) in Chinese territory. There he got help from a Khotanese monk by the name of Śīladharma in translating a number of the sutras he had brought with him.

In 789 he wanted to return to his homeland but the route across the Tarim Basin was closed, so he took a route through Uighur territory. As the "Chanyu" or leader of the Uighurs did not believe in Buddhism he had to leave the Sanskrit texts he had collected in the library of a temple in Beiting (Urumchi). However, he took the translated sutras and the tooth relic with him and returned to the capital Chang'an in early 790 after 40 years away. The translated sutras and the tooth relic of the Buddha were presented to the Emperor and he was rewarded with official titles and given the name of Wukong. He then retired to the recently built Zhangjing monastery in the capital and visited his parents' graves. The date of his death is unknown as the biography ends in 790.

Although he does not seem to have been well-educated, and had to have the sutras translated for him, and his brief biography was written by someone else, he was a keen observer and "his biography forms at least a precious complement and natural continuation of the gallery of "the Eminent Monks who went in search of the Law in the Western Countries during the period of the Great Tang Dynasty." It is a source of information about the political situation in the southern Hindukush and Taklamakan regions in an obscure and troubled period.

== See also ==
- Chinese Buddhism
