= Viśa' Saṃbhava =

- King of Khotan
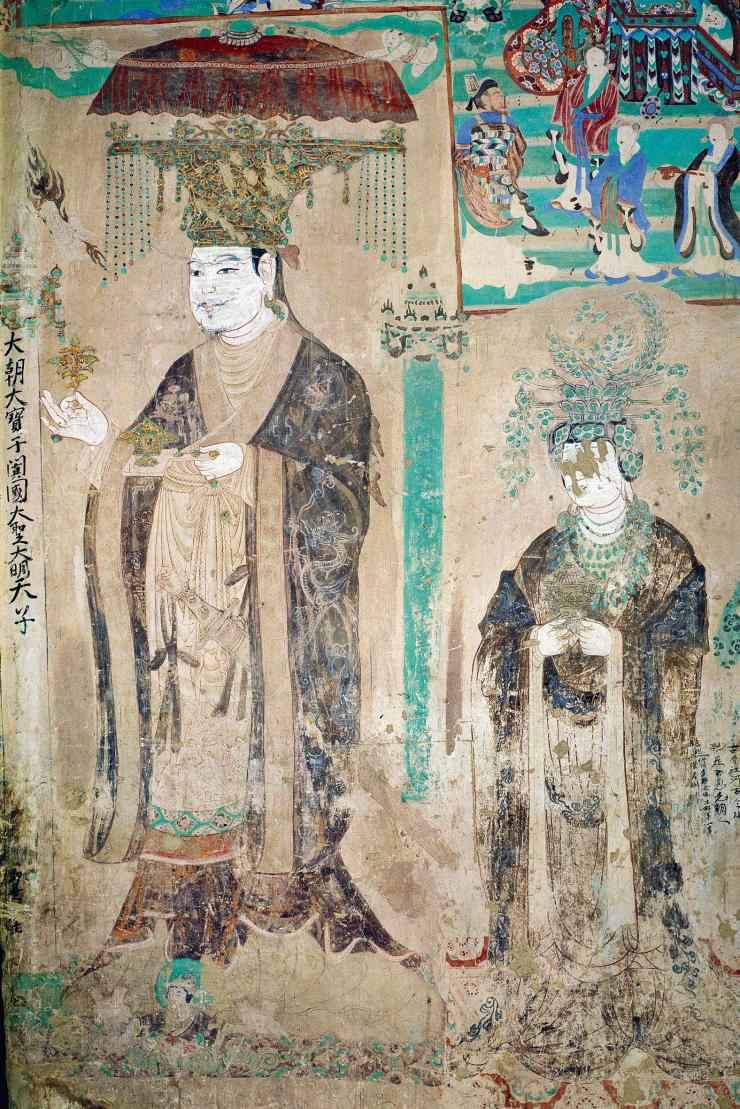
- Saṃbhava (left) and his queen consort Cao Yijin, Mogao Caves, 10th century. In this mural, they are both depicted in Chinese court attires.
- Reign: 912–962/966
- Successor: Viśa' Śūra
- Died: 962, 966 or 967
- Spouse: Queen consort Cao
- Religion: Khotanese Buddhism

Viśa' Saṃbhava (Khotanese: Viśa' Saṃbhava; in traditional Chinese: 尉遲僧烏波; simplified Chinese: 尉迟僧乌波; pinyin: Yùchí Sēngwūbō; Wade–Giles: Yü-ch῾ih Sêng-wu-p῾o; Chinese name: Li Shengtian, traditional Chinese: 李聖天; simplified Chinese: 李圣天; pinyin: Lǐ Shèngtiān; Wade–Giles: Li Shêng-t῾ien; died 962, 966 or 967) was the king of Khotan from 912 to 962, 966 or 967. He adopted Tongqing (同慶, lit. 'celebrating together') as his era name.

He married the second daughter of Cao Yijin, the first governor of the Guiyi Circuit; they had a son named Viśa' Śūra, who would become king of Khotan after his father's death. In another act of marital diplomacy, Cao Yijin's grandson, Cao Yanlu, married Saṃbhava's third daughter.

== Bibliography ==
- Rong, Xinjiang (2013), Eighteen Lectures on Dunhuang, Brill, doi:10.1163/9789004252332, ISBN 9789004250420
