= Qiemo =

Qiemo may refer to:

- Qiemo County
- Qiemo Town
- Qiemo River
