= Qiemo Airport (former) =

Qiemo Airport 且末机场
- IATA: ~~IQM~~; ICAO: ~~ZWCM~~

Summary
- Airport type: Public (closed)
- Operator: Civil Aviation Administration of China
- Location: Qiemo, Xinjiang, China
- Elevation AMSL: 1,252 m / 4,108 ft
- Coordinates: 38°8′58″N 85°31′58″E

Map

Runways
Direction	Length		Surface
Direction	m	ft	Surface
01/19	1,700	5,577	Asphalt

Qiemo Airport was an airport serving Qiemo Town in Xinjiang Uyghur Autonomous Region, China. After passenger service to the airport ended in 2011, a 2012 CAAC report stated that Qiemo Airport had been closed. It was replaced by Qiemo Yudu Airport in December 2016, where Qiemo Town regained commercial air service.

== History ==
Qiemo Airport received its last passenger flights in 2011. In the same year, civil aviation officials in Xinjiang announced that a new airport would be built to serve Qiemo Town. In its 2012 Civil Aviation Development Statistics Bulletin, the CAAC reported that Qiemo Airport had been closed. The new airport, Qiemo Yudu Airport, opened on 19 December 2016, where commercial air service to Qiemo Town resumed. The new airport has a runway longer than that of Qiemo Airport.

== Infrastructure ==
The airport resided at an elevation of 1,252 metres (4,108 ft) above mean sea level. It had one paved runway with dimensions 1,700 by 25 metres (5,577 ft × 82 ft).
