= IQM =

IQM may refer to:

- Interquartile mean, a statistical measure
- Qiemo Yudu Airport, China (IATA code)
  - Qiemo Airport (former) (former IATA code)
