= Yudu =

Yudu may refer to:

- Yudu County in the south of Jiangxi province, China
- Qiemo Yudu Airport, in Qiemo Town, Xinjiang Uyghur Autonomous Region, China
- Yudu (festival), summer festival in the Korean calendar
