= Shanshan =

Former kingdom in central Asia

Shanshan 鄯善
- c. 77 BCE–c. 630
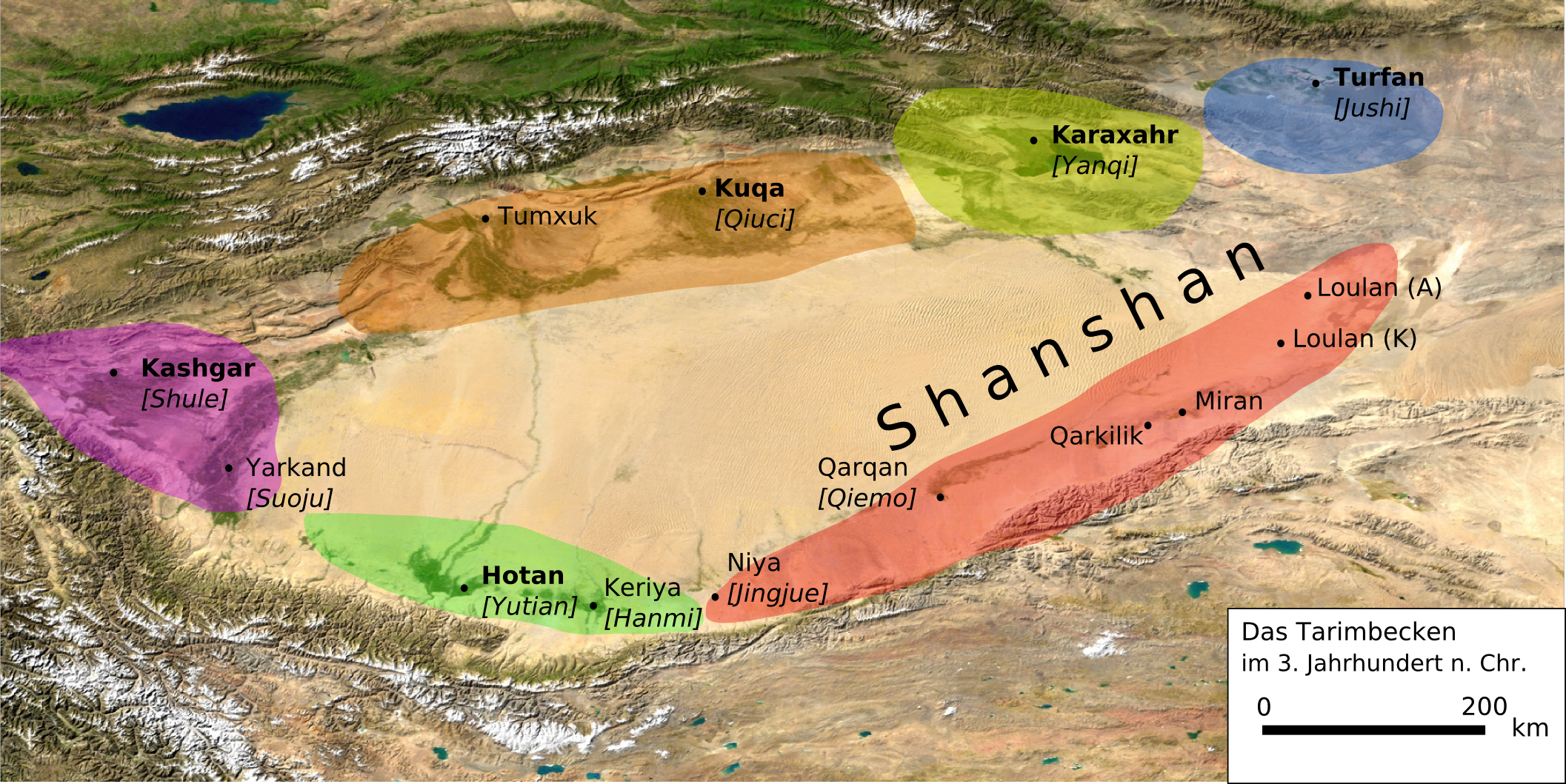
- Tarim Basin in the 3rd century
- Status: Chinese vassal
- Capital: Loulan
- Common languages: Gandhari Prakrit (administrative)
- Religion: Buddhism
- Government: Monarchy
- History
  - Vassalage: c. 77 BCE
  - Abandonment: c. 630

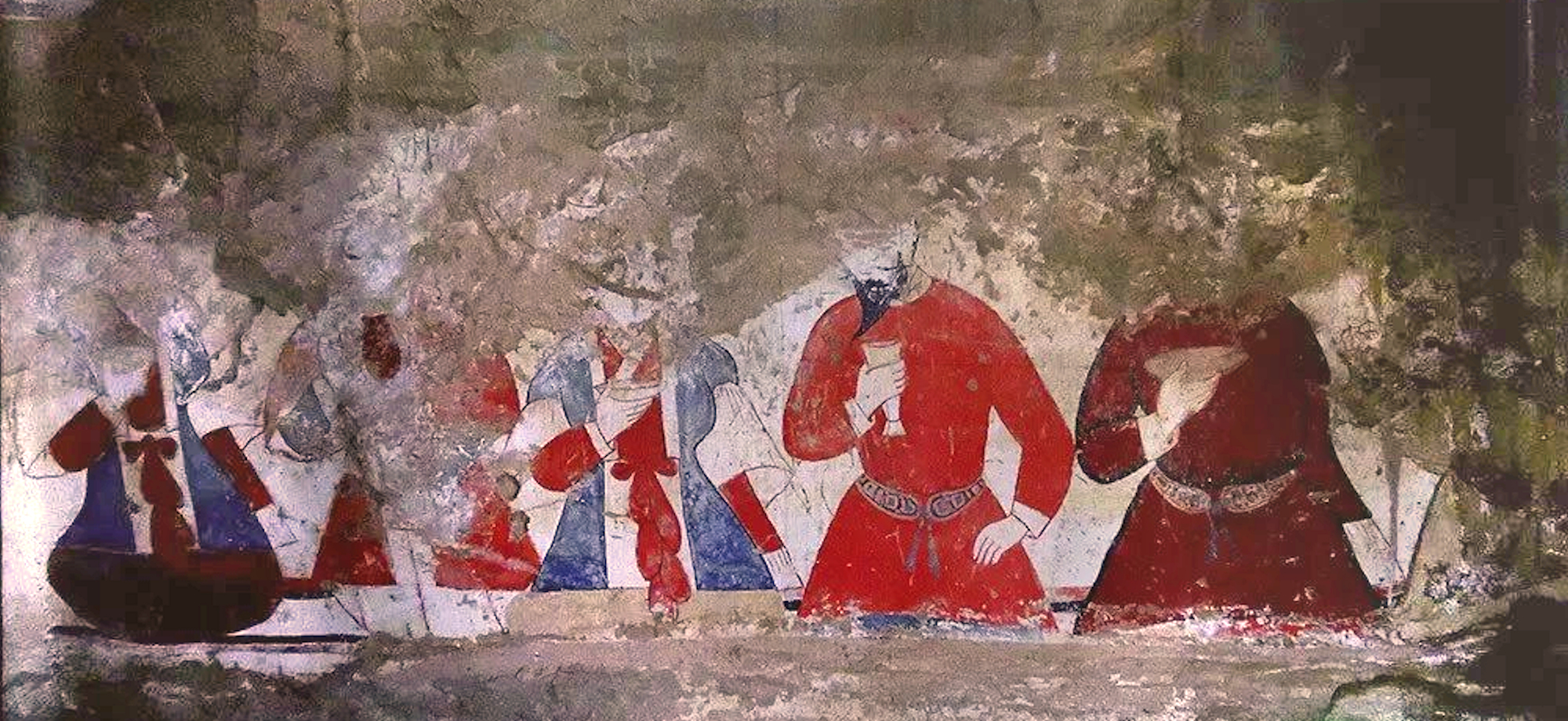
Loulan tomb mural, 220-420 CE. Loulan Museum

Shanshan (Chinese: 鄯善; pinyin: Shànshàn; Uyghur: پىچان, romanized: Pichan, lit. 'Piqan') was a kingdom located at the north-eastern end of the Taklamakan Desert near the great, but now mostly dry, salt lake known as Lop Nur.

The kingdom was originally an independent city-state, known in local Gandhari documents as Kroraïna (Krorayina, Kröran) – which is commonly rendered in Chinese as Loulan. The Western Han dynasty took direct control of the kingdom some time after 77 BCE, and it was later known in Chinese as Shanshan. The archaeologist J. P. Mallory has suggested that the name Shanshan may be derived from the name of another city in the area, Cherchen (later known in Chinese as Qiemo). A local variety of Gandhari was used in the kingdom for administrative, literary, and epigraphic purposes. Scholars such as Thomas Burrow have suggested the local population might have spoken a hypothetical Tocharian C, as evidenced by the loanwords in those Gandhari documents.

== Location ==
The kingdom of Kroraïna (Loulan), later Shanshan, was probably founded at a strategically located walled town, near the north-west corner of Lop Nur, next to the then outflow of the Tarim River into Lop Nur (40° 9’ N, 89° 5’ E). The site of Kroraïna covered about 10.8 hectares (27 acres) with a Buddhist pagoda about 10 metres (33 feet) high, numerous houses, and irrigation ditches.

The kingdom included the city of Charklik (near the modern town of Ruoqiang to the south-west of Lop Nur), Cherchen (later Qiemo), as well as Niya, further to the south-west.

== History ==
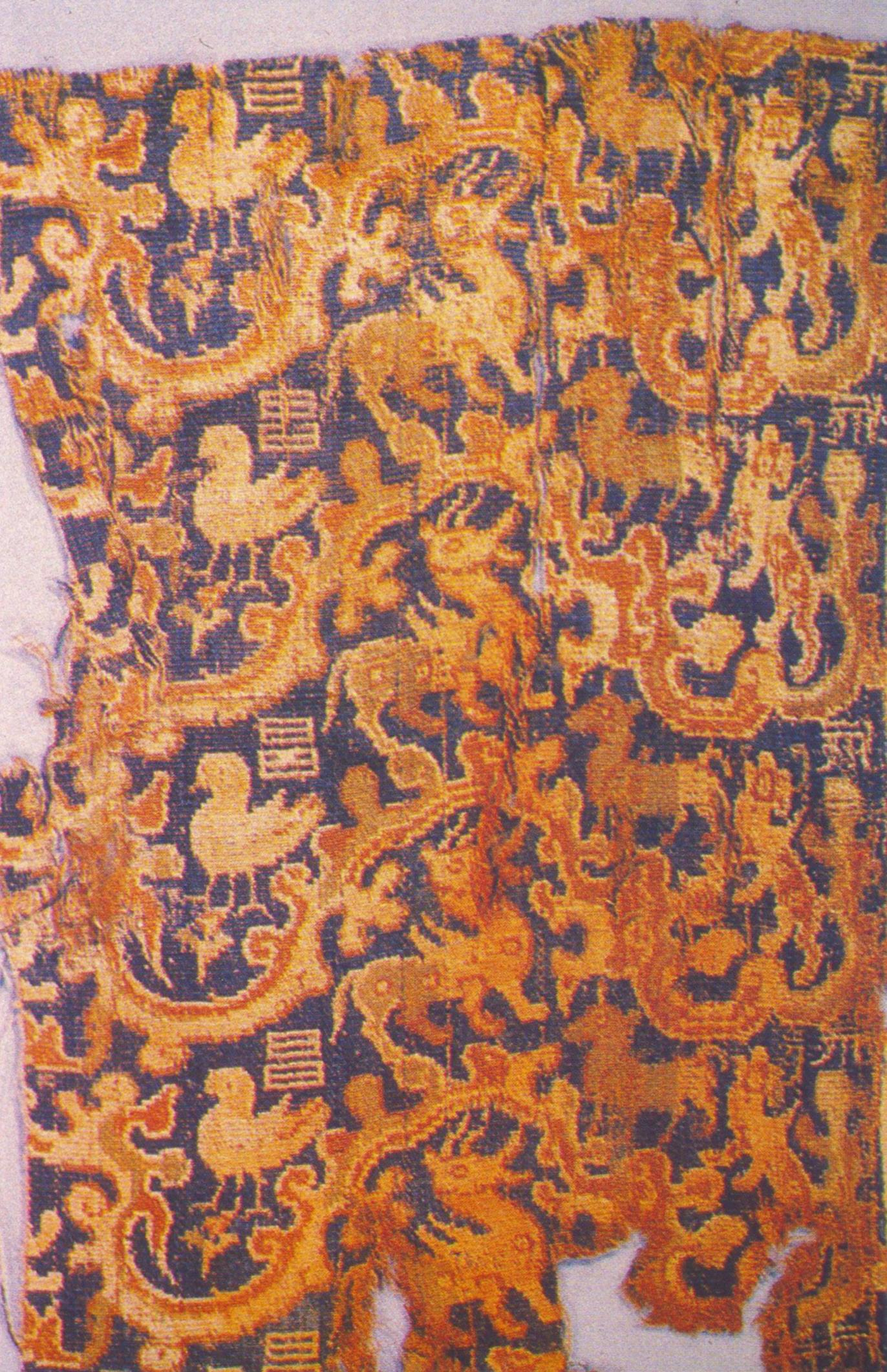
Sichuan brocade fragment uncovered in Loulan Kingdom

=== Han dynasty ===
In 126 BCE, the Chinese envoy, Zhang Qian described Loulan as a fortified city near Lop Nur.

Because of its position on what became the main routes from China to the West, controlling both the Southern Route between Dunhuang and Khotan, and the main Silk Route from Dunhuang to Korla Kucha and Kashgar during the Former Han and Later Han; control of the kingdom was regularly contested between the Chinese and the Xiongnu. The Xiongnu repeatedly contested the Han Chinese for control of the region until well into the 2nd century CE.

In 77 BCE, the Chinese envoy Fu Jiezi was sent to kill the Loulan king, named Changgui or Angui (嘗歸 or 安歸), after several Han envoys were kidnapped and killed. He arrived on the pretext of carrying gold and valuables to the outer states and intending to give a presentation to the king, but stabbed the Loulan king to death while he was drunk. The king's younger brother Weituqi (尉屠耆) was then installed as the king of Loulan by the Han ruler, and the kingdom was renamed Shanshan.

The newly installed king requested the presence of Han forces in Yixun (伊循), due to his fear of retribution from the sons of the assassinated king in Loulan. Chinese army officers were therefore sent to colonise the area, and an office of commandant was established at Yixun.

In 25 CE it was recorded that Shanshan was in league with the Xiongnu. In 73 AD, the Han army officer Ban Chao went to Shanshan with a small group of followers, which was also receiving a delegation from the Xiongnu. Ban Chao killed the Xiongnu envoys and presented their heads to the King, after which King Guang of Shanshan offered his allegiance to Han.

Loulan was later recorded as a dependent kingdom of Shanshan in the 3rd century Weilüe.

=== Buddhism in Shanshan ===
An inscription in the Kharoṣṭhī script was found at Endere, originally written around the middle of the 3rd century CE. The inscription describes the king of Shanshan as a follower of Mahāyāna Buddhism — one who has "set forth in the Great Vehicle." The king whom this refers to was probably Aṃgoka, who was the most powerful king of Shanshan. According to Richard Salomon, there is every reason to believe that Mahāyāna Buddhism was prominent in Shanshan at this time and enjoyed royal patronage.

More evidence of the official adoption of Mahāyāna Buddhism in Shanshan is seen in a letter inscribed in wood, which dates to several decades later. The letter describes the Great Cozbo Ṣamasena as one who is "beloved of men and gods, honoured by men and gods, blessed with a good name, who has set forth in the Mahāyāna."

=== Three Kingdoms period ===
A military colony of 1,000 men was established at Loulan in 260 CE by the Chinese general Suo Mai (索勱). The site was abandoned in 330 CE due to a lack of water when the Tarim River, which supported the settlement, changed course, and the military garrison was moved 50 km south to Haitou. The fort of Yingpan to the northwest remained under Chinese control until the Tang dynasty.

=== Jin dynasty to early Tang ===
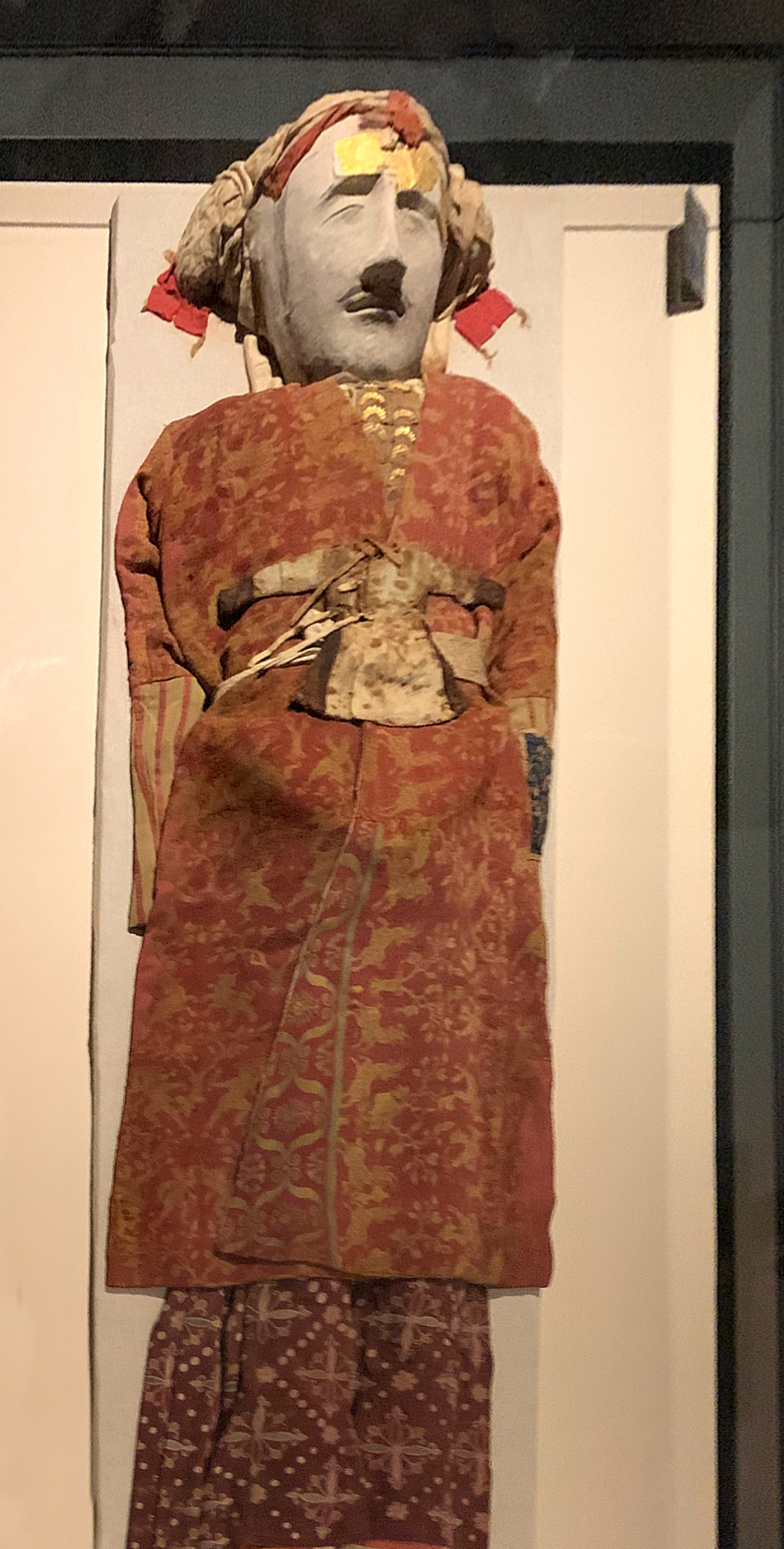
The Yingpan man, Xinjiang, China, 4th-5th century CE. He may have been a member of the State of Shan.

Chinese rule continued into the Western Jin dynasty and intermittently in later centuries. It was recorded that in 283 the son of the king was sent as a hostage to the Chinese court during the reign of Emperor Wu of Jin dynasty. In the 5th century, the Northern Wei installed a Chinese king in Loulan and called the city the Shanshan Fort. Then at the end of the 6th century, the Sui dynasty established the city state of Shanshan at Loulan.

The Chinese pilgrim monk, Faxian, stayed about a month in Shanshan after a 17-day journey from Dunhuang in 399 CE. He described the country as "rugged and hilly, with a thin and barren soil. The clothes of the common people are coarse, and like those worn in our land of Han, some wearing felt and others coarse serge or hair. ... The king professed (our) Law, and there might be in the country more than four thousand monks, who were all students of the hînâyana. ... (The monks) ...were all students of Indian books and the Indian language."

From the 5th century onwards, however, the land was frequently invaded by nomads such as Tuyuhuns, the Rourans, and the Dingling, and the area became gradually abandoned. In the spring of 442 CE, Loulan was invaded by Juqu Anzhou and its king fled to Jumo (Cherchen), and Shanshan then came to be ruled from Qiemo.

At around 630 (at the beginning of the Tang dynasty), the remaining Shanshan people, led by Shanfutuo (鄯伏陁), migrated to Hami in the Northern area. The Buddhist pilgrim Xuanzang passed through this region in 644 on his return from India to China, visited a town called Nafubo (納縛波, thought to be Charklik) of the Loulan country, and he also wrote of Qiemo: "A fortress exists, but not a trace of man".

=== Modern era ===
In 2011, the local government decided to undertake a large-scale development aimed at positioning Shanshan as "The Desert Tourism City" to attract a larger number of tourists to the area. Tourism and attraction development consultant Leisure Quest International (USA) was retained to develop a master plan and conceptual design for the development. The plan includes development of a themed destination which would include a walled city reminiscent of ancient Loulan, desert-facing hotels, shops and restaurants as well as a themed residential development.

A county is named after Shanshan (Piqan County) in modern Xinjiang, although it lies outside of the historical area of Shanshan.

== Rulers ==
This is a list of kings who ruled Shanshan from Chinese sources:

- Changgui/Anhui – 嘗歸/安歸 – 92–77 BCE
- Weituqi – 尉屠耆 – 77 BCE
- An – 安 – 40 BCE
- Guang – 廣 – 75 CE
- You Huan – 尤還 – 123 CE
- Yuan Meng – 元孟 – 330 CE
- Xiumito – 休密馱 – 383 CE
- Bilong – 比龍 – 441 CE
- Zhenda – 真達 – 441–445 CE

In addition, the Kharosthi texts also list these kings:

- Tomgraka
- Tajaka
- Pepiya
- Amgvaka
- Mahiri
- Vasmana (=Yuan Meng?)

== Towns ==
- Lop Desert
- Loulan
- Niya
- Miran

== See also ==
- Silk Road transmission of Buddhism
