= Tatrang =

Tatrang ئويتوغراق يېزىسى 塔提让镇 Tatirang
- Town
- Location in Xinjiang Tatrang (China)
- Coordinates: 38°28′16″N 085°41′43″E
- Country: China
- Autonomous Region: Xinjiang
- Prefecture: Bayingolin
- County: Qiemo / Qarqan
- Villages: 5

Population (2010)
  - Total: 4,226

Ethnic groups
  - Major ethnic groups: Uyghur
- Time zone: UTC+8 (China Standard)

Tatrang, Tatirang (تاتىراڭ بازىرى Chinese: 塔提让镇) is a town in Qiemo / Qarqan County, Bayingolin Mongol Autonomous Prefecture, Xinjiang, China.

== History ==
In 1969, Tuanjie Commune (团结公社) was established.

In 1980, Tuanjie Commune became Tatrang Commune (塔提让公社).

In 1984, Tatrang Commune became Tatrang Township (塔提让乡).

In 1986, an 800-year old manuscript copy of Romance of the Western Chamber and twenty-seven other documents were stumbled upon in Tatrang (Tatirang).

On October 20, 2014, Tatrang Township became Tatrang Town (塔提让镇) and the boundaries of the town were adjusted adding 26,848 km^{2} (10,366 mi^{2}) of land previously administered directly by the county government to the administration of Tatrang.

== Geography ==
Tatrang is located on the Qiemo / Qarqan River. Tatrang originally included about 10,000 km^{2} (3,900 mi^{2}) of land. In 2014, 26,848 km^{2} (10,366 mi^{2}) of land was added to Tatrang.

== Administrative divisions ==
Tatrang includes five villages:

Villages:

- Bashitatirang (Bashita Tirangcun; 巴什塔提让村) 38°28′12″N 085°41′18″E
- Taitukule / Taitukuole (Taitu Kuolecun; 台吐库勒村 / 台吐阔勒村) 38°26′22″N 085°39′11″E
- Serikebuyang (Serike Buyangcun;色日克布央村) 38°28′16″N 085°41′43″E
- Ayaketatirang (Ayake Tatirangcun; 阿亚克塔提让村) 38°29′00″N 085°44′15″E
- Aderesiman (Adere Simancun; 阿德热斯曼村) 38°28′30″N 085°44′04″E

== Demographics ==
Historical population
Year	Pop.	±% p.a.
2000	3,244	—
2010	4,226	+2.68%

As of 1997, 80% of the residents of Tatrang Township were Uyghur.

== Historical maps ==
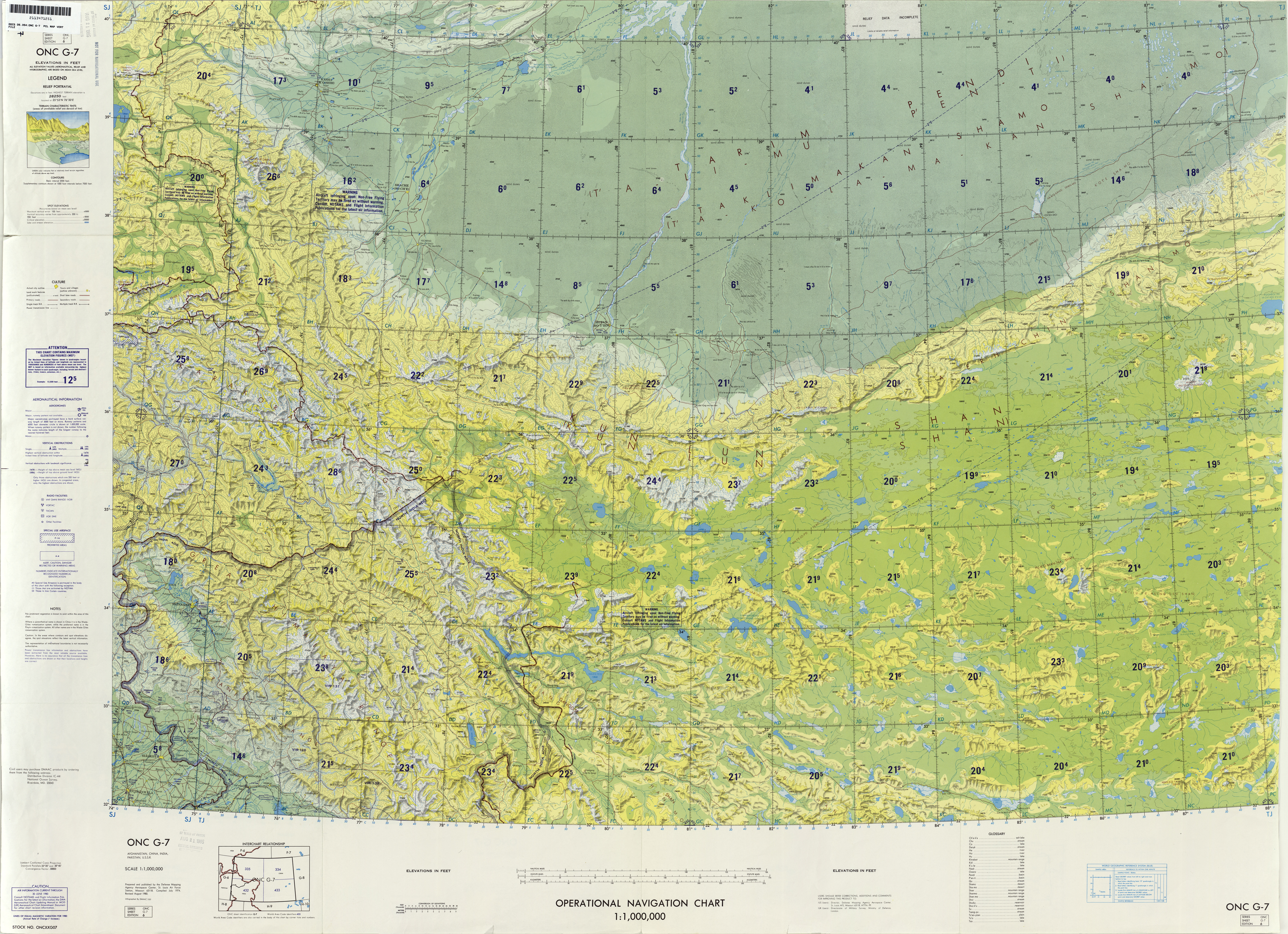
Map including Tatrang (T’a-t’a-lang) (DMA, 1980) (Note: From map: "The representation of international boundaries is not necessarily authoritative.")

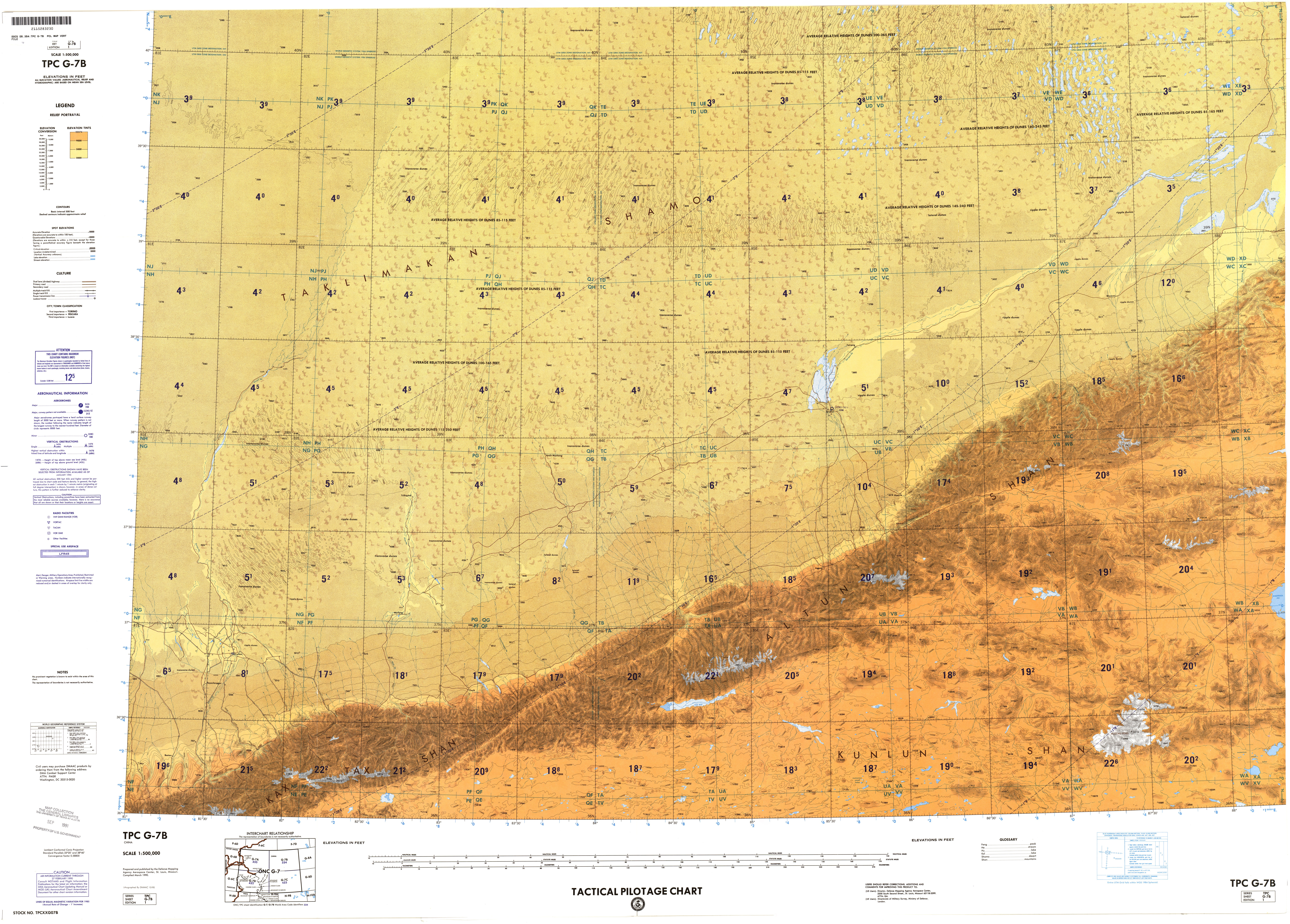
Map including Tatrang (DMA, 1990)

== See also ==
- List of township-level divisions of Xinjiang
