= Cherchen Man =

Natural mummy from the Taklamakan Desert

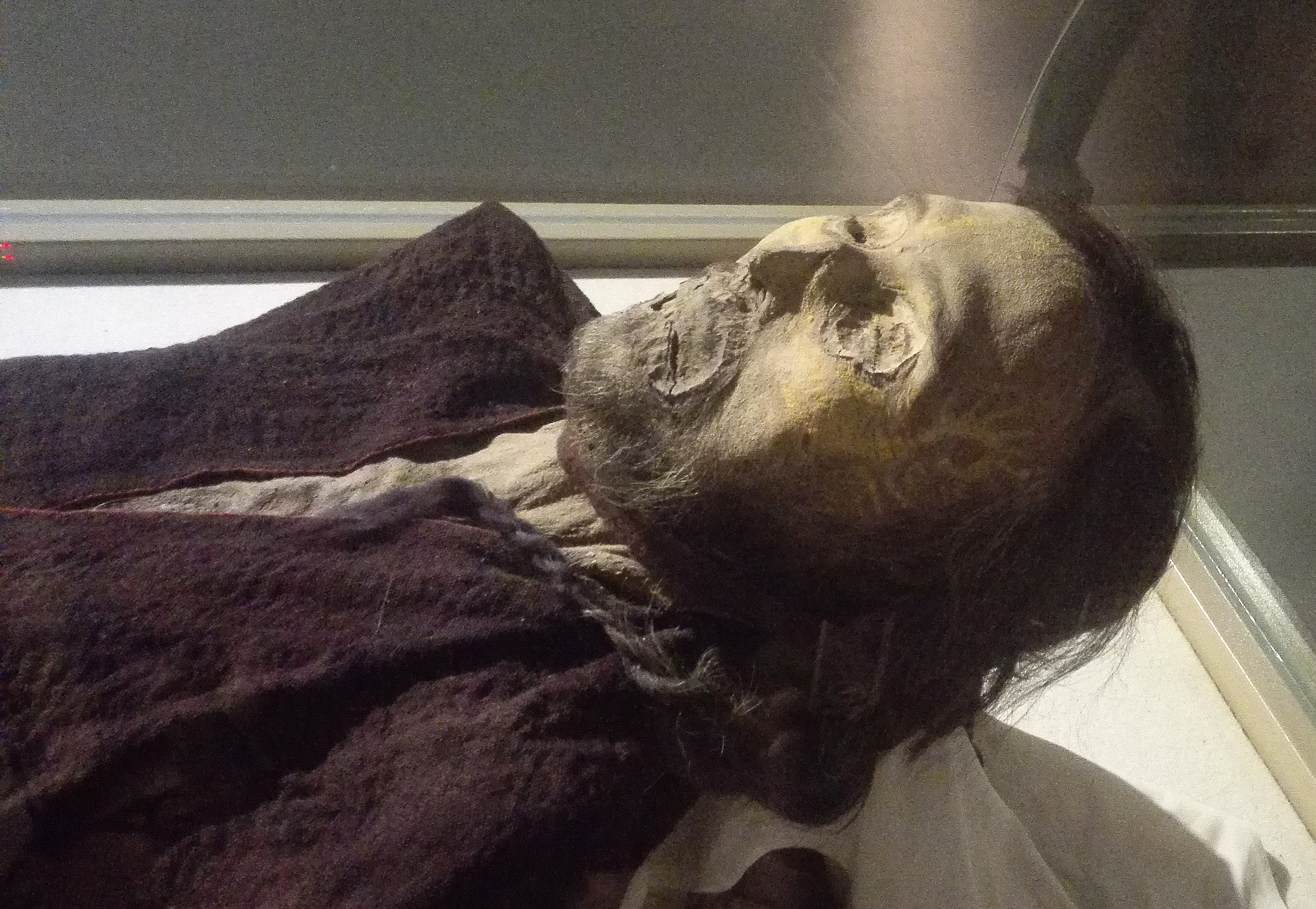
- The mummified remains of Cherchen Man on display at the Xinjiang Museum
- Died: c. 1st millennium BCE (aged about 50)
- Resting place: Xinjiang Museum, Ürümqi, Xinjiang, China
- Other names: Chärchän Man; Ur-David
- Known for: Naturally preserved Tarim mummy excavated from the Zaghunluq cemetery
- Height: 176 cm (5 ft 9 in)

Cherchen Man or Chärchän Man or Ur-David is the modern name given to a mummy found in the town Cherchen, located in current Xinjiang region of China. The mummy is a member of the group known as Tarim mummies. His naturally-mummified remains were discovered in Tomb 2 at the Zaghunluq cemetery, near the town of Qiemo (Chärchän) in the Taklamakan Desert of north-west China. Other such remains have also been recovered at sites throughout the Tarim Basin, including Qäwrighul, Yanghai, Shengjindian, Shanpula (Sampul), and Qizilchoqa.

== Discovery ==
The individual who became known as Cherchen Man was discovered in September 1985 at the Zaghunluq cemetery in Xinjiang, northwestern China. The cemetery lies about 6 km (3.7 mi) south of the town of Qiemo, also known as Cherchen, near the southern edge of the Tarim Basin. Archaeologists had begun preliminary investigations at the site earlier that year. The cemetery extended about 1.1 km (0.68 mi) from north to south and 750 m (2,460 ft) from east to west and contained several hundred graves.

During the September excavation, archaeologists opened five tombs. Three had already been broken into, while two remained intact. The two intact graves were designated Tombs 85QZM 1 and 85QZM 2. Tomb 85QZM 1 contained an infant, while Tomb 85QZM 2 contained four adults: Cherchen Man and three women.

Based on similarities in their burial clothing, archaeologist Victor H. Mair suggested that Cherchen Man, one of the women and the infant may have formed a family group.

== Burial and associated remains ==
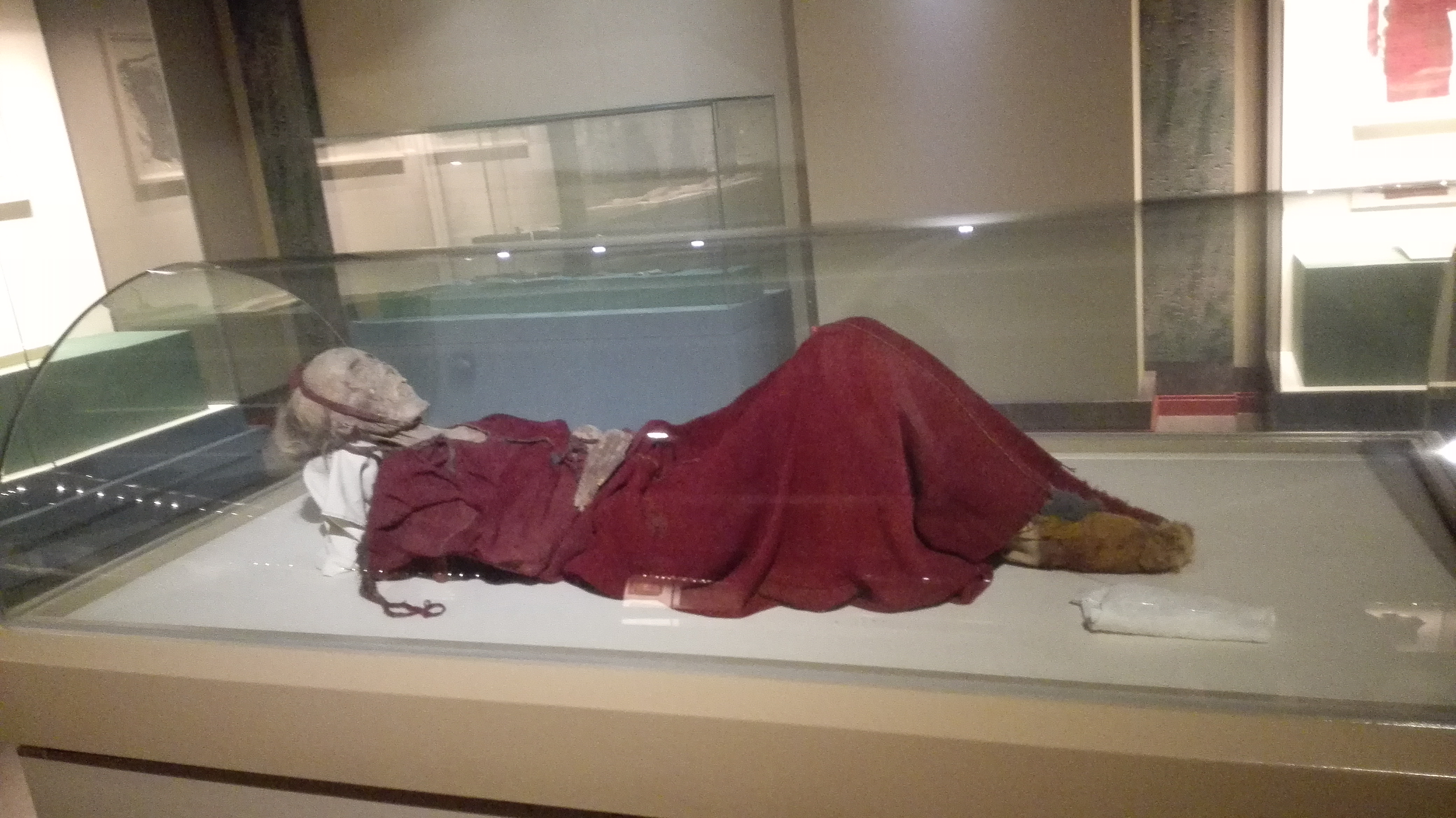
One of the women buried at Zaghunluq and associated with the burial of Cherchen Man

=== Tomb 85QZM 2 - adult burials ===
Cherchen Man was buried with three women in Tomb 85QZM 2. He lay on his right side with his legs bent and supported by a small piece of wood. Two of the women lay on their backs directly on the earth, with their arms and legs crossed. The third woman was positioned differently, with her feet resting on a ledge around the burial chamber and only her upper back and head lying on the floor.

The four adults were placed in a large rectangular grave with straight walls. At ground level, it measured 5.35 m (17.6 ft) long and 3 m (9.8 ft) wide, narrowing below ground to a chamber measuring 3.1 m × 1.55 m (10.2 ft × 5.1 ft). The grave reached a maximum depth of 2.4 m (7.9 ft). The ledge around the chamber was about 0.75 m (2.5 ft) high and wide. Twenty-five tree branches stretched across it and supported layers of willow mats, animal skins and reed mats above the burials. Willow mats also covered part of the floor. A human hand and an unidentified animal had been carved into one of the tomb walls.

Animal remains were also found around the tomb. A sheep's head lay among the reeds covering the chamber. About 1.75 m (5.7 ft) southwest of the tomb, archaeologists found the skull and foreleg of a horse. The bones had been removed from the foreleg, leaving the skin and hoof, which had been stuffed with reeds.

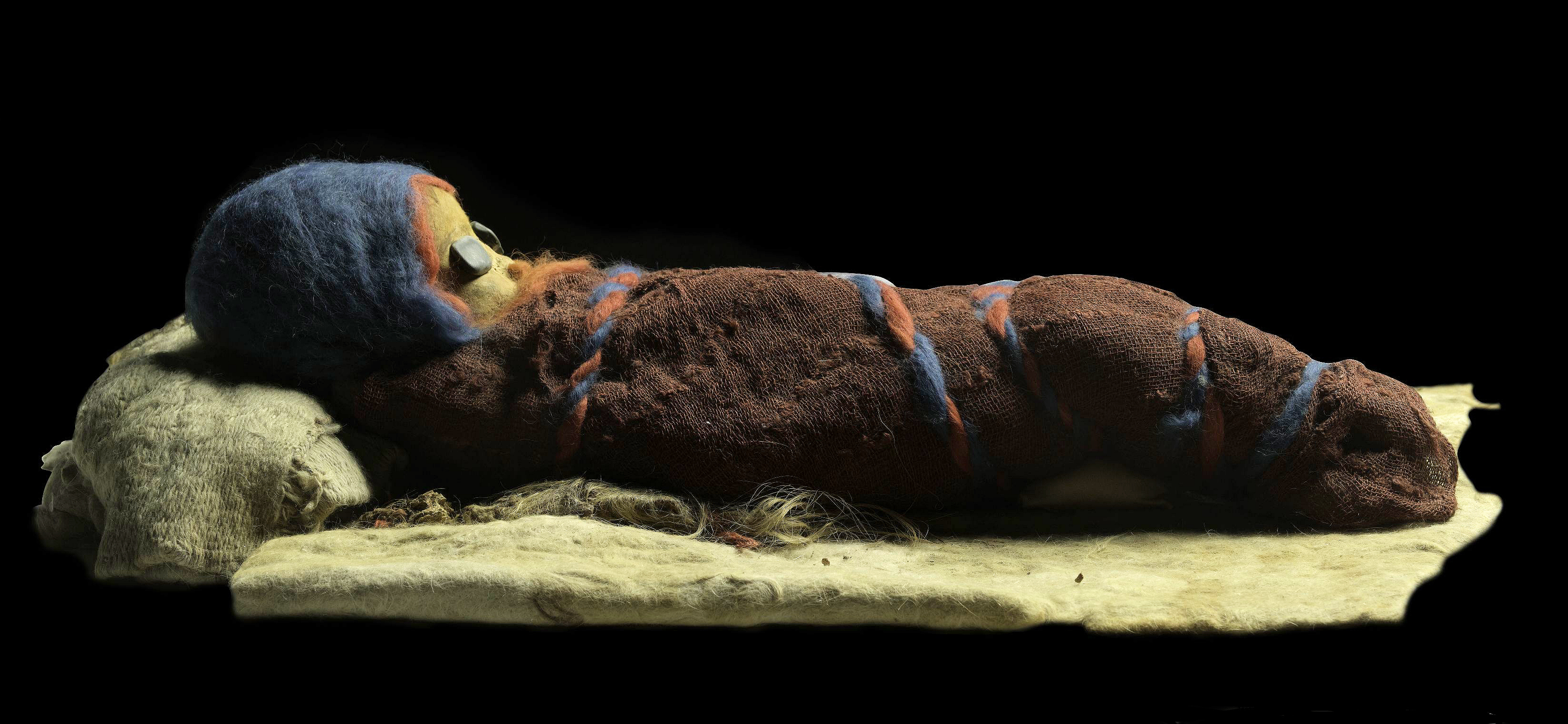
The infant buried separately in Tomb 85QZM 1

=== Tomb 85QZM 1 - infant burial ===
An infant was buried separately in Tomb 85QZM 1. The child had been wrapped in purple wool, which was bound tightly with woollen string, and laid on a white felt blanket. Its head rested on a pillow of raw wool wrapped in woollen cloth and was covered by a blue woollen hat. Two small, flat, uncarved stones had been placed over the eyes.

The infant's oval grave was much smaller than the adults' tomb, measuring 1.75 m (5.7 ft) long, 0.8 m (2.6 ft) wide and 0.3 m (0.98 ft) deep. Beneath a layer of reeds, the grave was covered by a 1.3 m (4.3 ft) slab of poplar wood. About 0.8 m (2.6 ft) northwest of the grave, archaeologists found another sheep's head buried in a separate hole.

== Condition and preservation ==
Cherchen Man is an exceptionally well-preserved Tarim mummy. His body was naturally mummified by the arid conditions of the Tarim Basin rather than through deliberate embalming. Soft tissues and other organic materials survived in remarkable condition, allowing archaeologists to examine the burial and its contents in unusual detail.

The cemetery was situated in salt-rich sandy soil in an area known locally as Tuzluqqash ("salt rock"), conditions that helped inhibit decay and preserve both the human remains and associated organic materials. Together with the region's arid climate, these environmental conditions helped preserve the burial and its contents for more than three millennia.

== Description ==
The mummy is an adult male who is believed to have died around 1000 BC and is likely to have been aged around fifty years at the time of his death. His height is estimated at 176–178 cm. His hair was "reddish brown flecked with grey, framing high cheekbones", he had an aquiline "long nose, full lips and a ginger beard".

== Associated objects and clothing ==
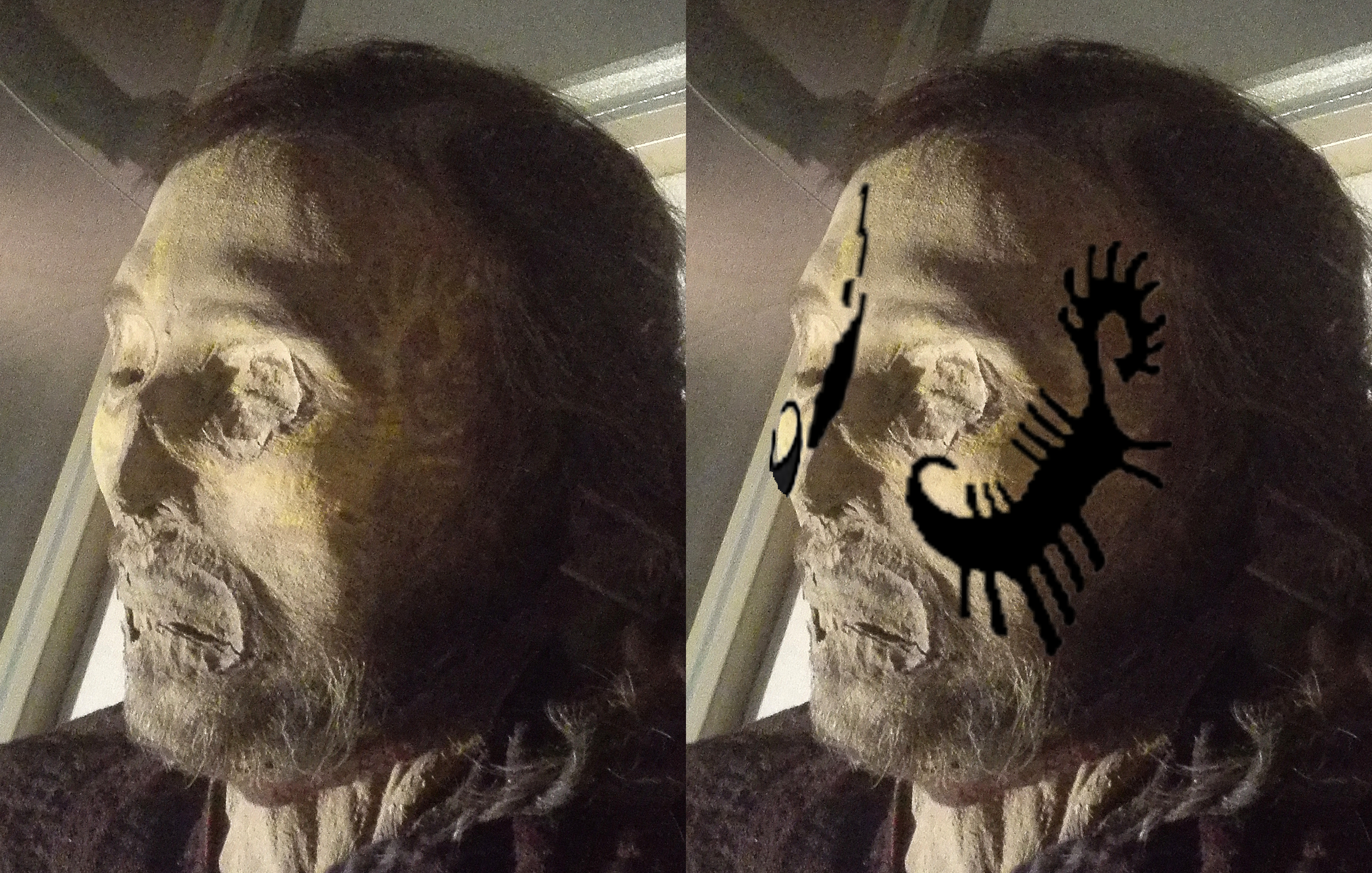
Facial tattoos or paint of the Cherchen man

The Cherchen Man was buried wearing a red twill tunic, striped woollen leggings, and white deerskin boots. The leggings have been described as having a pattern resembling tartan.

Yellow and purple motifs painted in ochre pigments were applied to the sides of his face. These spiral and sun-like designs have occasionally been misidentified as tattoos in popular accounts, but examination of the mummy has shown them to be painted decorations.

The associated burials included three women and an infant. The infant was buried wrapped in a burgundy-coloured shroud and wore a blue cashmere bonnet. Grave goods accompanying the child included a cow-horn cup and a sheep's udder that may have been used as a feeding vessel.

== Gallery ==
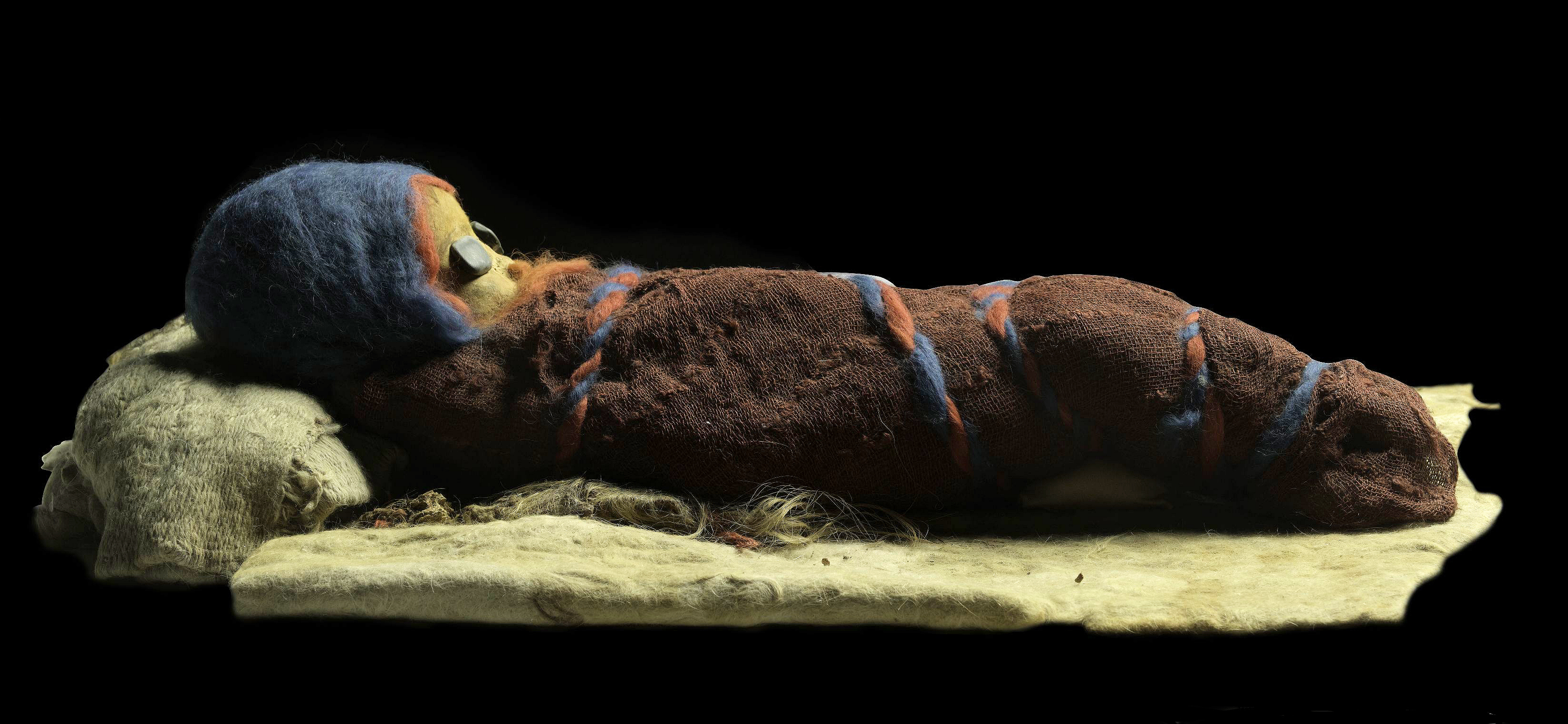
The infant mummy (Tomb A-2), probably the son of the Cherchen Man

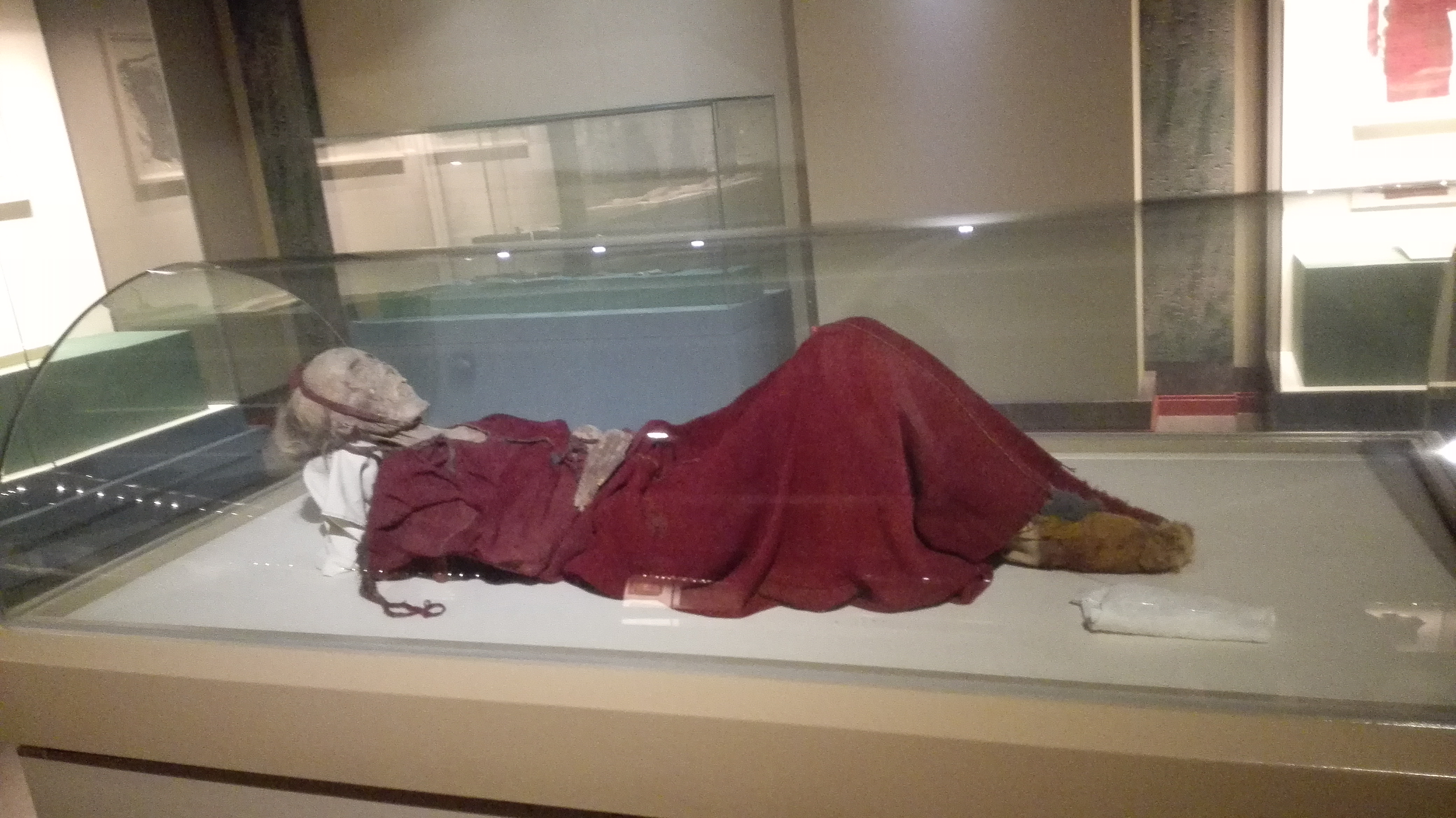
A wife of the Cherchen man

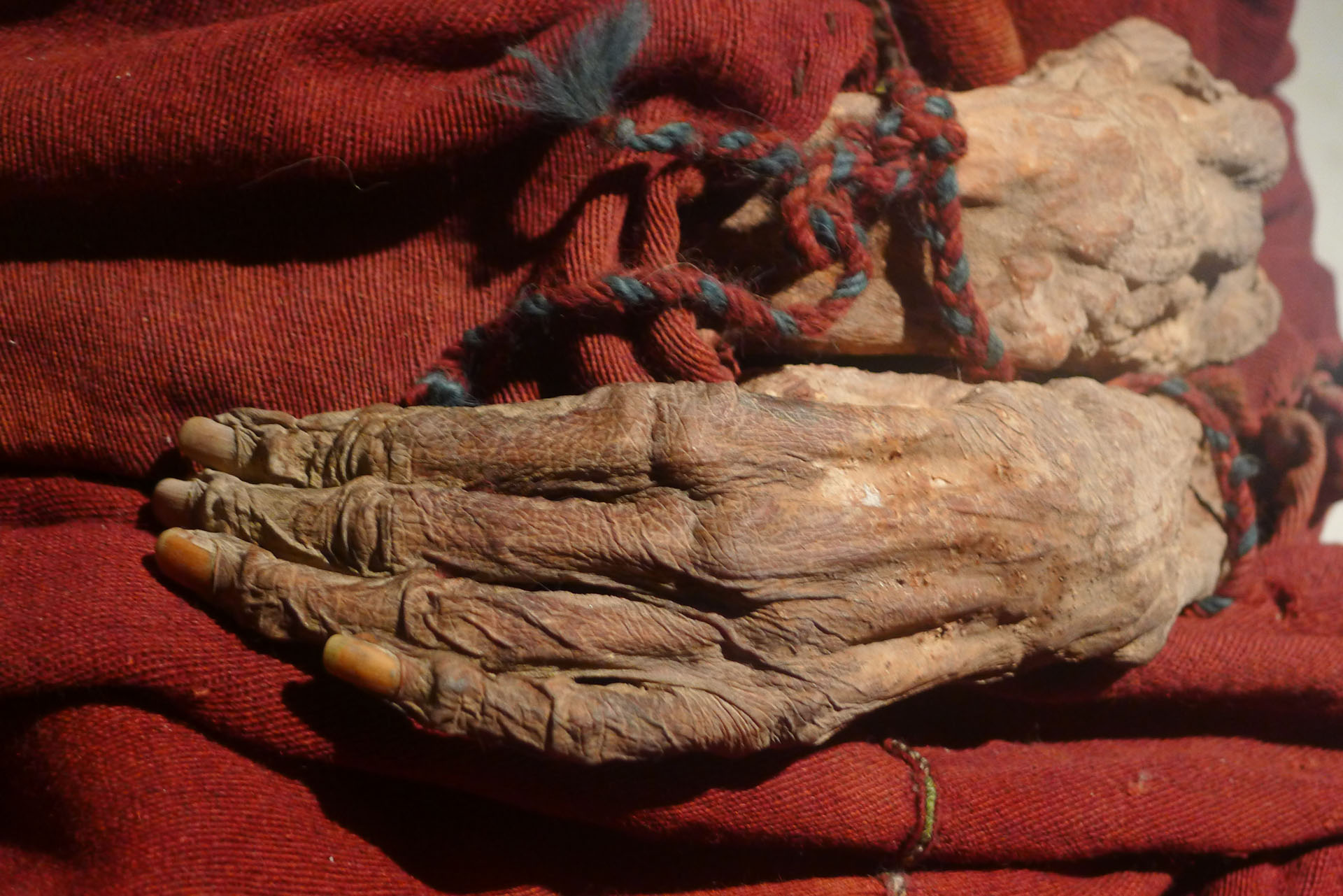
Cherchen female mummy hands

== See also ==
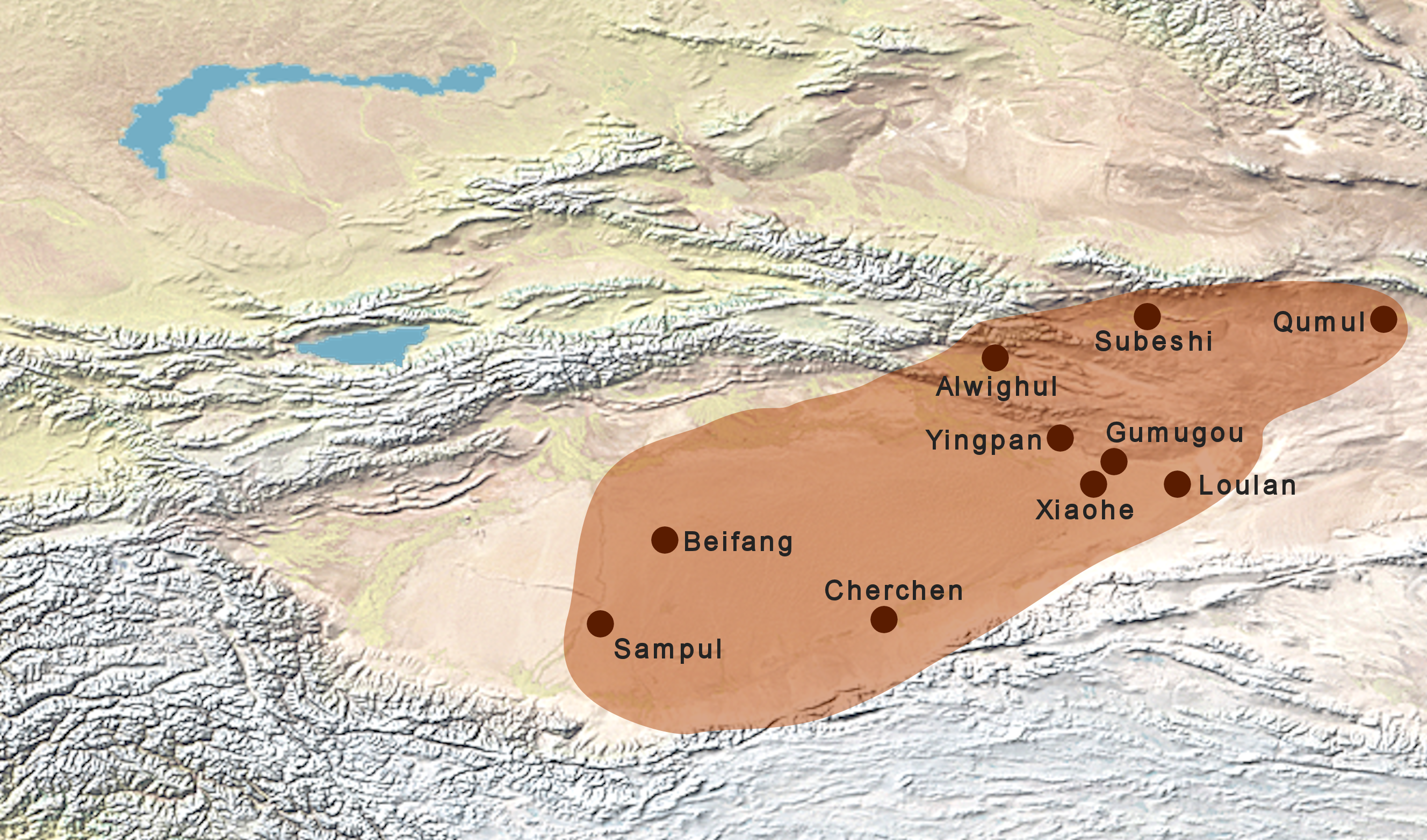
Location of Cherchen within the general area of the Tarim Mummies

- Subeshi culture, a contemporary culture in the northern area of the Tarim Basin
- Sogdia
- Tocharians
- Uyghurs
- Western Regions
- Wusun
- Yuezhi
- Kurgan Peoples
- Human Migration

== Links ==
- "Cherchen Man". chinesemummies.weebly.com. Chinese Mummies.
- "Secrets of Cherchen Man". The Archaeology News Network. 24 October 2011.
