= Qiemo River =

River in Xinjiang, China

Coordinates: 37°50′N 85°40′E

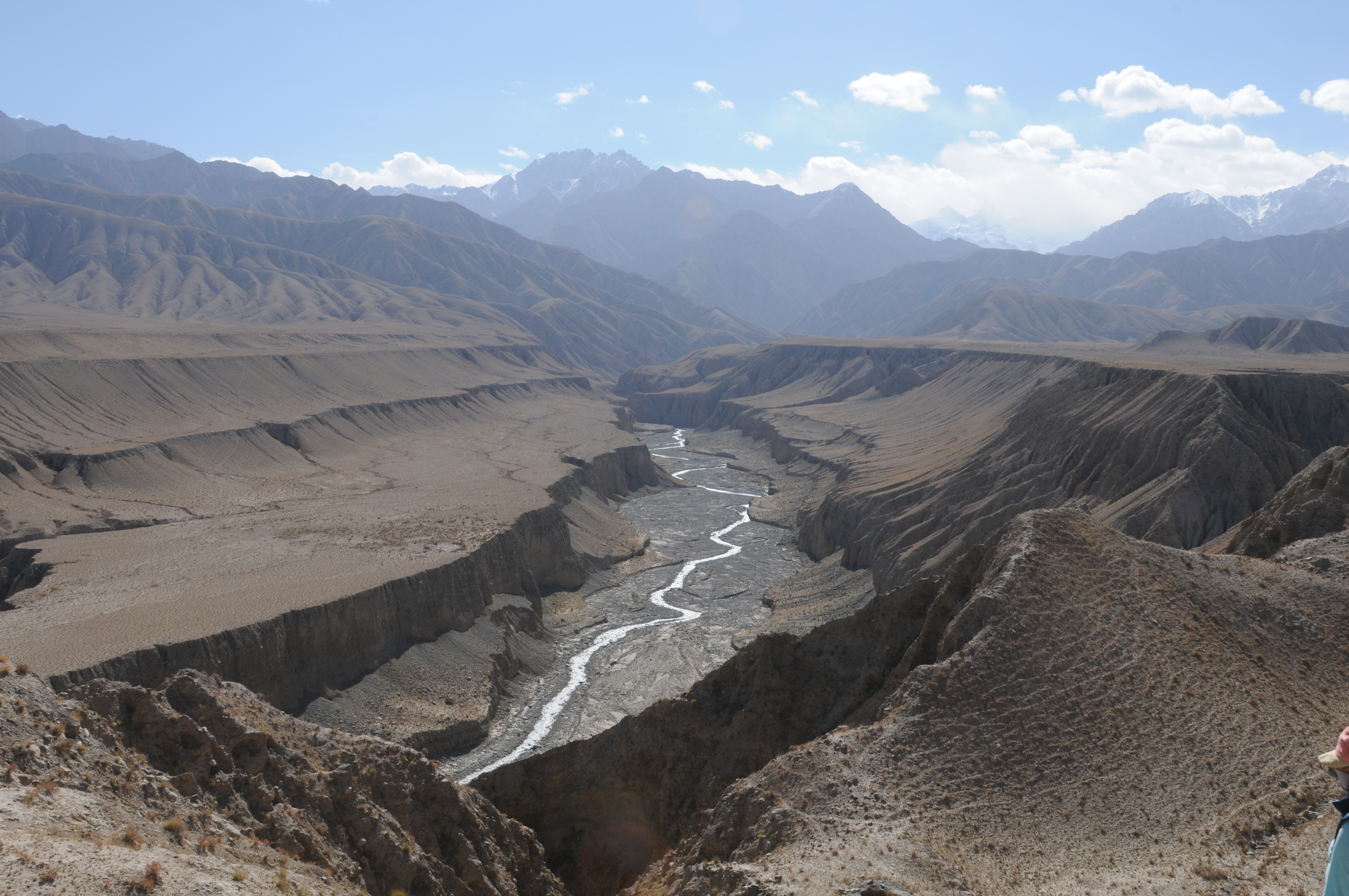
Qiemo River

The Qiemo River (Chinese: 且末河; pinyin: Qiěmò Hé), also called the Cherchen (Chinese: 车尔臣河; pinyin: Chē'ěrchén Hé; Wade–Giles: Ch'e-erh-ch'en Ho) or Qarqan River (Chinese: 恰尔羌河), runs across the Tarim Basin in the Xinjiang Uyghur Autonomous Region. It feeds into the Lop Nor salty marshes and the Taitema Lake.

== Historical maps ==
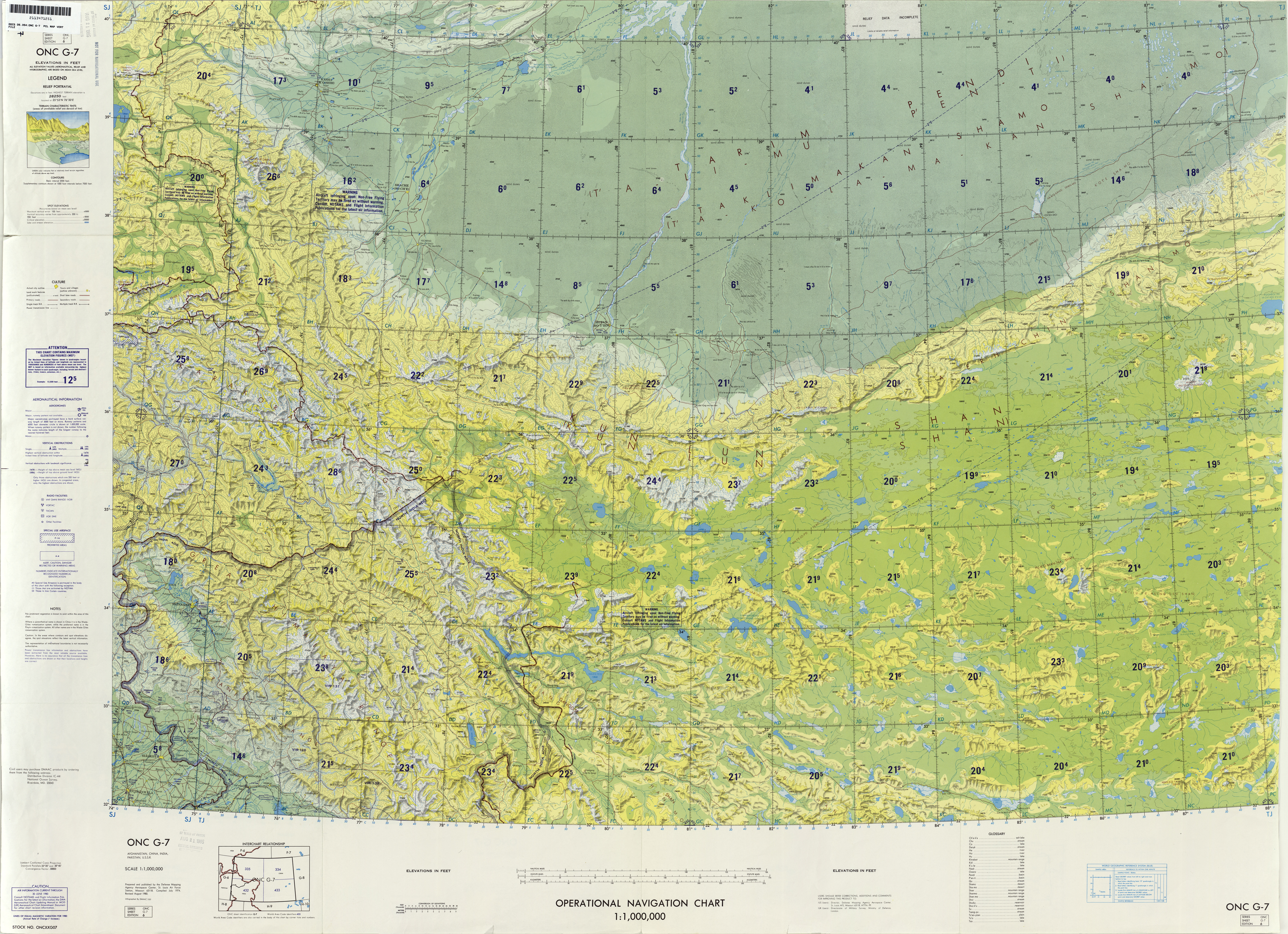
Map including the river (labeled as Ch'e-erh-ch'en Ho) (DMA, 1980) (Note: From map: "The representation of international boundaries is not necessarily authoritative.")

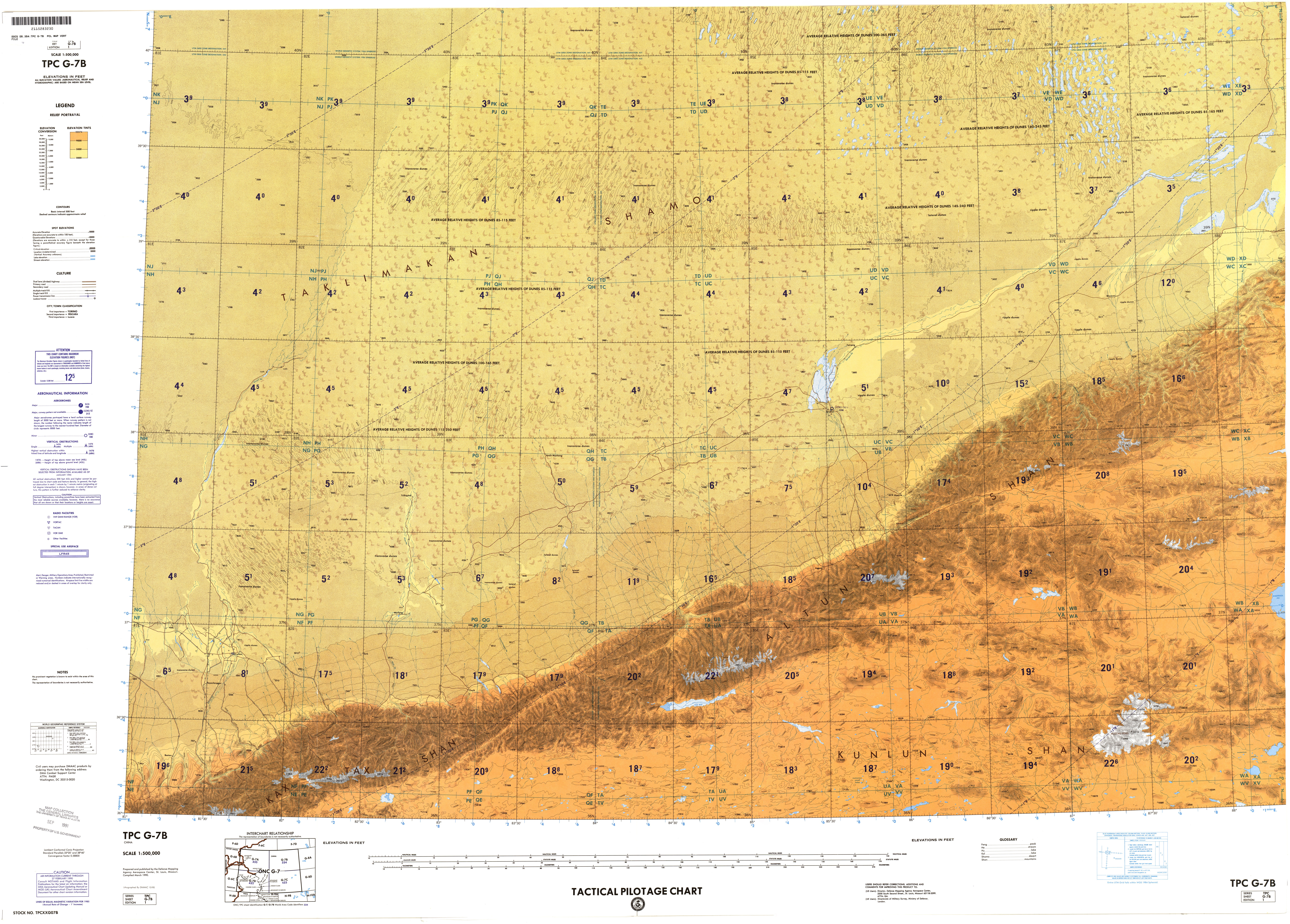
Map including the river (labeled as Qarqan He) (DMA, 1990)

== See also ==
- Qiemo County
- Qiemo Town
- Tatrang
