= Qiemo County =

Qiemo County چەرچەن ناھىيىسى (Uyghur) 且末县 (Chinese) Qarqan, Charchan, Chiehmo, Chü-mo, Jumo
- County
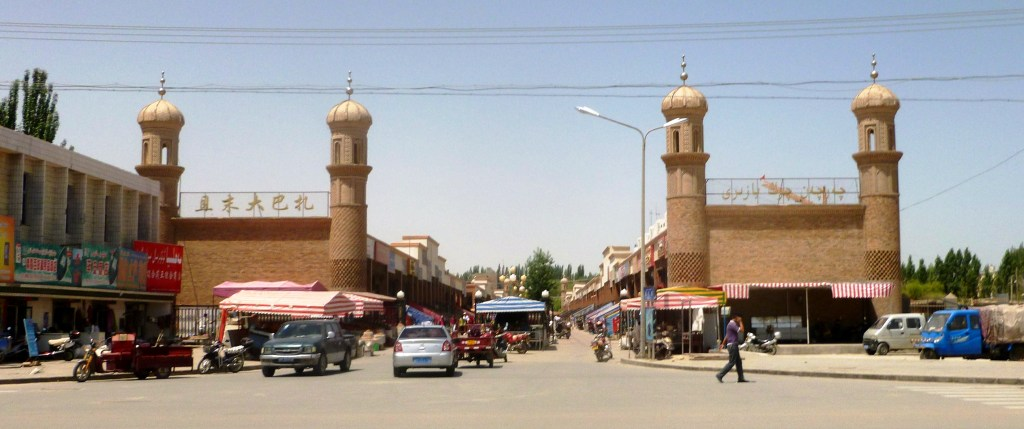
- Main entrance of a bazaar in the county seat of Qiemo

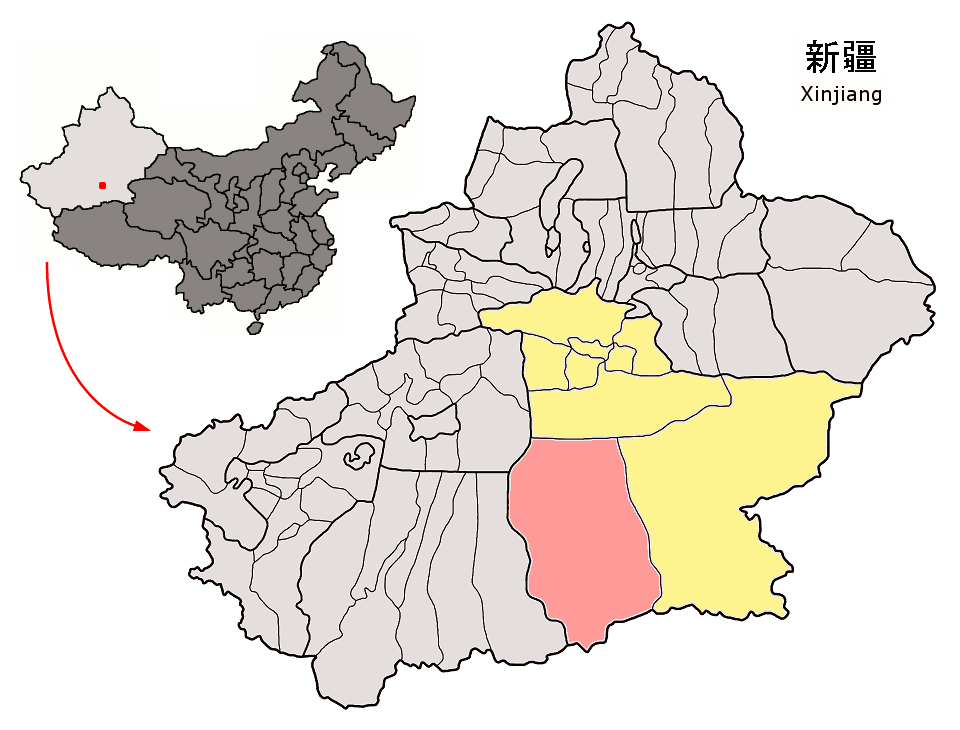
- Location of Qiemo County (pink) in Bayingolin Prefecture (yellow) and Xinjiang

- Location of the county seat in Xinjiang Qiemo (Xinjiang) Qiemo (China)
- Coordinates (Qiemo County government): 38°08′46″N 85°31′48″E
- Country: China
- Autonomous region: Xinjiang
- Autonomous prefecture: Bayingolin
- County seat: Qiemo (Qarqan)

Area
  - Total: 138,680 km^{2} (53,540 sq mi)

Population (2020)
  - Total: 69,236
  - Density: 0.49925/km^{2} (1.2931/sq mi)

Ethnic groups
  - Major ethnic groups: Uyghur, Han Chinese
- Time zone: UTC+8 (China Standard (Note: Locals in Xinjiang frequently observe UTC+6 (Xinjiang Time), 2 hours behind Beijing.))
- Postal code: 841900
- Website: www.xjqmx.gov.cn (in Chinese)

Qiemo County

Uyghur name
- Uyghur: چەرچەن ناھىيىسى
Transcriptions
- Latin Yëziqi: Cherchen Nahiyisi
- Yengi Yeziⱪ: Qərqən Naⱨiyisi
- SASM/GNC: Qarqan Nahiyisi
- Siril Yëziqi: Чәрчән Наһийиси

Chinese name
- Simplified Chinese: 且末县
- Traditional Chinese: 且末縣
Transcriptions
Standard Mandarin
- Hanyu Pinyin: Qiěmò Xiàn, Jūmò Xiàn
- Wade–Giles: Chʻieh³-mo⁴ Hsien⁴, Chü¹-mo⁴ Hsien⁴

Alternative Chinese name
- Simplified Chinese: 恰尔羌县
- Traditional Chinese: 恰爾羌縣
Transcriptions
Standard Mandarin
- Hanyu Pinyin: Qià'ěrqiāng Xiàn

Qiemo County (Chinese: 且末县) as the official romanized name, also transliterated from Uyghur as Qarqan County (Uyghur: چەرچەن ناھىيىسى; Chinese: 恰尔羌县), is a county under the administration of the Bayin'gholin Mongol Autonomous Prefecture in the Xinjiang Uyghur Autonomous Region of the People's Republic of China, bordering the Tibet Autonomous Region to the south. Its area is 138,645 square kilometers (53,531 sq mi) and, according to the 2002 census, it has a population of 60,000. The county seat is at Qiemo Town.

== Name ==
"Qiemo (W-G: Ch'ieh-mo) 且末 = modern Cherchen (Chinese: 车尔臣) or Charchan (Uyghur: Qarqan). There has been uncertainty about this name as Chavannes (1907), p. 156, and then Stein (1921a), Vol. I, 296 ff., gave an incorrect romanization for the first character. Chavannes, using the French EFEO romanization system, gave tsiu, and Stein used the Wade-Giles equivalent, chü. In fact, the character is correctly rendered k'ie in EFEO, ch'ieh in Wade–Giles and qie in pinyin. Nevertheless, there has never been any serious dispute about its identification with modern Cherchen."

It has been suggested that the name "Cherchen" may have been derived from Shanshan, the kingdom that once ruled the area. A number of different names have been used for the town, Lionel Giles has recorded the following names for Ruoqiang Town (with his Wade-Giles forms of the Chinese names converted to pinyin):

Jumo Han
Zuomo (左末) Song Yun
Jumo Jun [Sui]
Zhemotuona (折摩馱那) Xuanzang
Boxian Zhen (播仙鎭) [Tang, after A.D. 674]
Jurjān [Mīrzā Haidar, sixteenth century]
Charchan [modern name]

It was called Calmadana in Kharosthi documents found in the region.

== History ==
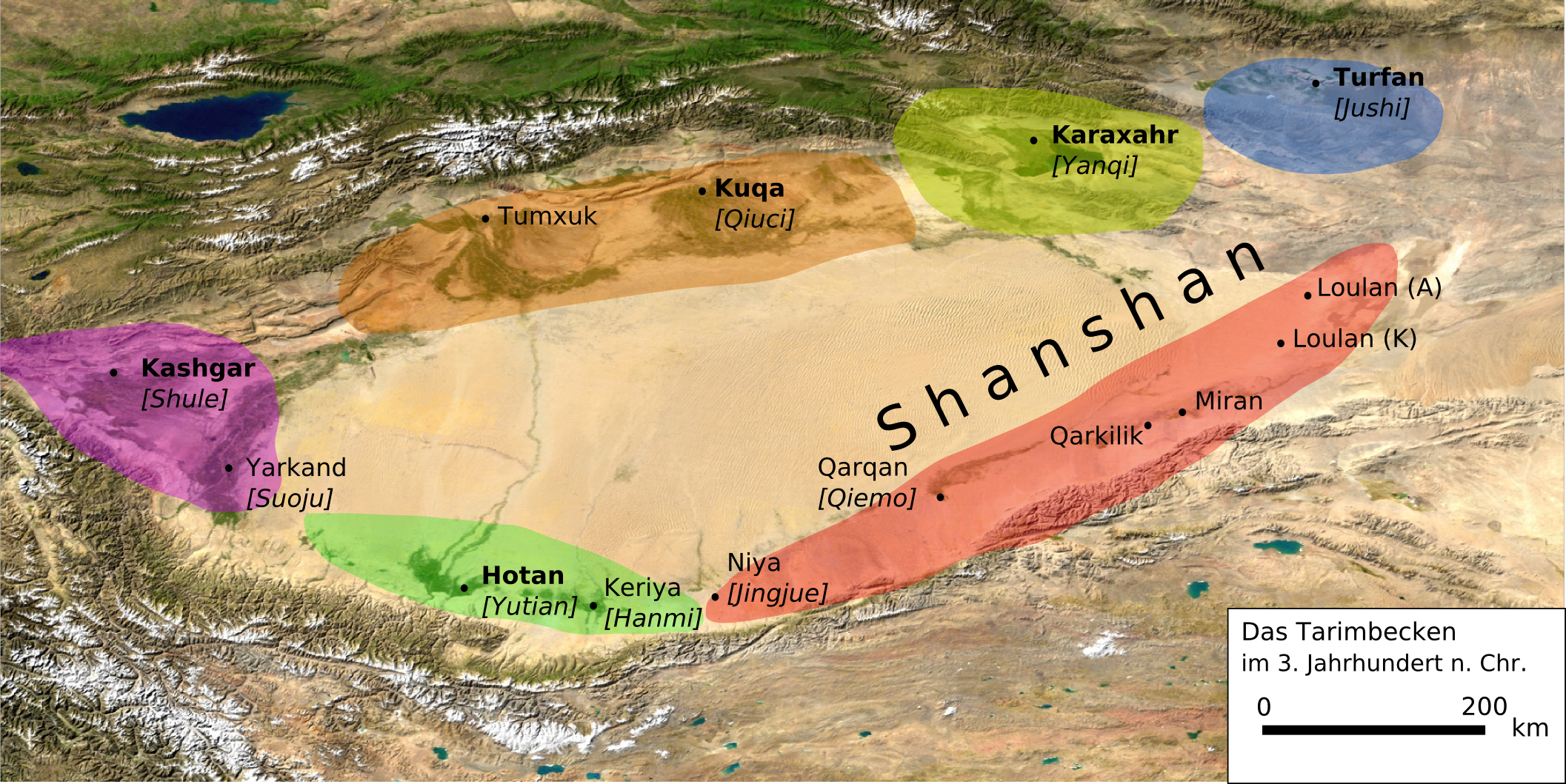
The Tarim Basin in the 3rd century CE, showing the Indo-European oasis kingdoms of Kašgar (Kashgar) [violet], Kotan/Hutan [green], Krążania (Krořän/Loulan/Shanshan) [pink], Kuša (Kucha/Ququa) [orange], Ārśi (Agni/Yanqui/Karaxahr) [olive] and Yarkoto/Guśi (Jushi/Turfan) [blue]. Ziemo (Quiemo) lies in the western part of Krořän/Loulan bordering Zhangzhung (Tibet) to the south, and which was since the 1st century CE known under its Chinese name Shanshan.

Several mummies were found in Cherchen including the Cherchen Man.

The modern county is based on the ancient kingdom of Qiemo (且末) mentioned in the Hanshu and the Hou Hanshu. According to the Hanshu, Qiemo/Cherchen had "230 households, 1,610 individuals and 320 persons able to bear arms."

The ancient Qiemo may have been located on the east of the Cherchen (Charchan / Qarqan) river, across from the modern Cherchen. Qiemo became part of Loulan Kingdom after it was under Chinese control during the Han dynasty and renamed Shanshan. Later in 442 CE, after an attack by Juqu Anzhou, King Bilong of Shanshan fled to Qiemo together with half of his countrymen so Shanshan came to be ruled by Qiemo.

The Buddhist pilgrim Xuanzang passed through this region in 644 on his return from India to China, visited a town called Nafubo (納縛波, thought to be Charklik) of Krořän (Loulan), and wrote of Ziemo (Qiemo), "A fortress exists, but not a trace of man".

Marco Polo who passed through Cherchen mentioned it as a province with a town of the same name as its chief city. Its inhabitants were described as Muslims.

In August 2014, local authorities in Cherchen County (Qiemo County) announced, "Incentive Measures Encouraging Uighur-Chinese Intermarriage," including a 10,000 CNY (1,450 USD) cash reward per annum for the first five years to such intermarried couples as well as preferential treatment in employment and housing plus free education for the couples, their parents and offspring. County CCP Secretary Zhu Xin remarked:

Our advocacy of intermarriage is promoting positive energy ... Only by promoting the establishment of a social structure and community environment in which all ethnic groups are embedded in each other ... can we boost the great unity, ethnic fusion and development of all ethnic groups in Xinjiang, and finally realize our China dream of great rejuvenation of our Chinese nation

== Geography ==
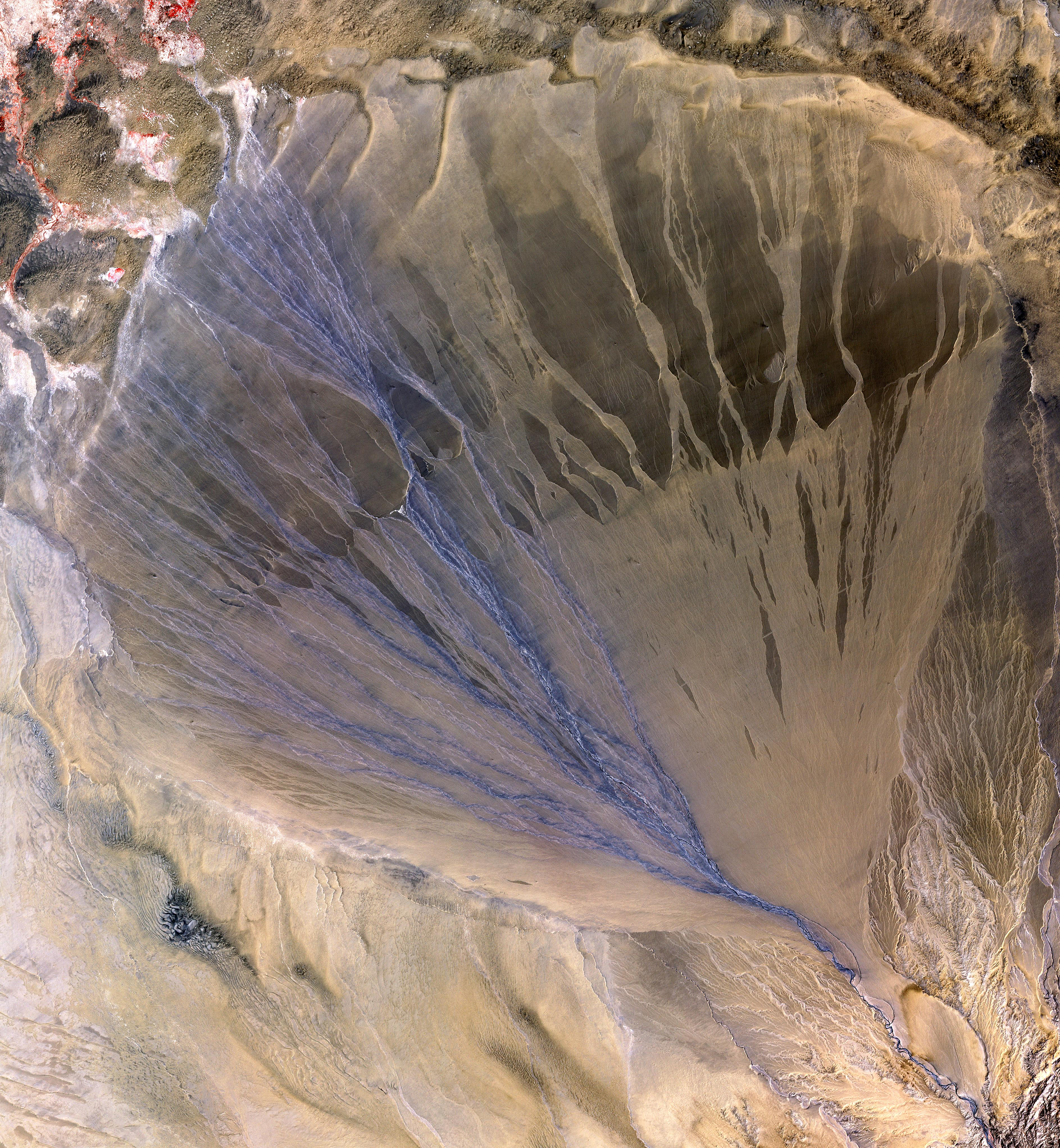
A view from the space of an alluvial fan in the foothills of the Altyn-Tagh in the western part of the county (37°26′55″N 84°16′53″E)

From the south to the north, the lands of the county run from the main range of the Kunlun Mountains (which forms the border with the Tibet Autonomous Region) to the middle of the Taklamakan Desert. The southernmost area of the county includes the northern side of part of the Ulugh Muztagh range (the main range of the Kunlun), and a section of the Altyn-Tagh range which runs roughly parallel to the main range of the Kunlun. Most of the county population lives in the northern foothills of the mountains, in the oases watered by snow-fed rivers.

The Qiemo River (Qarqan River) near the town of Ziemo (Qiemo) is frozen for two to three months in the winter. From the foot of the mountains to the oasis of Ziemo (Qiemo), it has a faIl of nearly 4000 feet.

=== Climate ===
Typically for Xinjiang, Qiemo has a harsh cool arid climate (Köppen BWk). It is one of the very driest places in this dry autonomous region, receiving an average of less than 25 millimetres or 1 inch of rainfall equivalent every year. Summer days are hot, although nights are fairly pleasant, whilst winters are chilly although less severe than in more northerly parts of Xinjiang, with average maxima above freezing except in January.

Climate data for Qiemo, elevation 1,247 m (4,091 ft), (1991–2020 normals, extremes 1971–present)
Month	Jan	Feb	Mar	Apr	May	Jun	Jul	Aug	Sep	Oct	Nov	Dec	Year
Record high °C (°F)	17.5 (63.5)	18.4 (65.1)	31.1 (88.0)	36.9 (98.4)	38.2 (100.8)	40.6 (105.1)	41.6 (106.9)	41.5 (106.7)	36.9 (98.4)	33.2 (91.8)	24.4 (75.9)	21.5 (70.7)	41.6 (106.9)
Mean daily maximum °C (°F)	−0.5 (31.1)	6.1 (43.0)	15.8 (60.4)	23.7 (74.7)	28.4 (83.1)	32.1 (89.8)	34.0 (93.2)	32.9 (91.2)	28.1 (82.6)	20.3 (68.5)	10.4 (50.7)	1.3 (34.3)	19.4 (66.9)
Daily mean °C (°F)	−7.6 (18.3)	−1.5 (29.3)	7.4 (45.3)	15.3 (59.5)	20.2 (68.4)	24.3 (75.7)	26.2 (79.2)	24.6 (76.3)	19.1 (66.4)	10.4 (50.7)	1.9 (35.4)	−5.6 (21.9)	11.2 (52.2)
Mean daily minimum °C (°F)	−13.6 (7.5)	−8.2 (17.2)	−0.5 (31.1)	7.0 (44.6)	12.1 (53.8)	16.6 (61.9)	18.6 (65.5)	16.6 (61.9)	10.6 (51.1)	2.1 (35.8)	−4.6 (23.7)	−11.1 (12.0)	3.8 (38.8)
Record low °C (°F)	−27.3 (−17.1)	−26.7 (−16.1)	−12.7 (9.1)	−5.2 (22.6)	−0.1 (31.8)	6.4 (43.5)	10.9 (51.6)	6.3 (43.3)	−0.1 (31.8)	−8.3 (17.1)	−16.3 (2.7)	−23.0 (−9.4)	−27.3 (−17.1)
Average precipitation mm (inches)	0.9 (0.04)	0.6 (0.02)	0.5 (0.02)	1.2 (0.05)	3.5 (0.14)	8.3 (0.33)	5.6 (0.22)	2.9 (0.11)	1.3 (0.05)	0.4 (0.02)	0.4 (0.02)	0.8 (0.03)	26.4 (1.05)
Average precipitation days (≥ 0.1 mm)	1.4	0.5	0.3	0.6	1.4	2.7	3.1	1.4	0.7	0.2	0.3	1.1	13.7
Average snowy days	4.2	1.2	0.2	0.1	0	0	0	0	0	0	0.5	3.6	9.8
Average relative humidity (%)	58	44	30	28	32	38	41	42	42	44	48	59	42
Mean monthly sunshine hours	182.1	184.0	220.1	230.1	248.1	243.5	253.5	255.9	254.7	257.2	211.8	178.2	2,719.2
Percentage possible sunshine	59	60	59	58	56	55	57	62	70	76	71	61	62
Source 1: China Meteorological Administrationall-time September high
Source 2: Weather China

Climate data for Tazhong Town, elevation 1,099 m (3,606 ft), (1991–2020 normals, extremes 1981–2010)
Month	Jan	Feb	Mar	Apr	May	Jun	Jul	Aug	Sep	Oct	Nov	Dec	Year
Record high °C (°F)	16.3 (61.3)	17.2 (63.0)	32.7 (90.9)	37.0 (98.6)	38.2 (100.8)	41.6 (106.9)	45.6 (114.1)	42.7 (108.9)	39.5 (103.1)	31.9 (89.4)	24.7 (76.5)	16.7 (62.1)	45.6 (114.1)
Mean daily maximum °C (°F)	−0.4 (31.3)	7.0 (44.6)	17.5 (63.5)	25.6 (78.1)	30.5 (86.9)	34.3 (93.7)	36.3 (97.3)	35.5 (95.9)	30.4 (86.7)	22.2 (72.0)	11.0 (51.8)	1.3 (34.3)	20.9 (69.7)
Daily mean °C (°F)	−10.0 (14.0)	−2.5 (27.5)	8.0 (46.4)	16.5 (61.7)	21.9 (71.4)	26.3 (79.3)	28.3 (82.9)	27.3 (81.1)	21.3 (70.3)	11.4 (52.5)	0.2 (32.4)	−8.5 (16.7)	11.7 (53.0)
Mean daily minimum °C (°F)	−18.3 (−0.9)	−11.9 (10.6)	−2.0 (28.4)	6.9 (44.4)	12.7 (54.9)	17.8 (64.0)	20.0 (68.0)	18.7 (65.7)	11.7 (53.1)	1.1 (34.0)	−8.6 (16.5)	−16.2 (2.8)	2.7 (36.8)
Record low °C (°F)	−32.6 (−26.7)	−32.7 (−26.9)	−12.3 (9.9)	−8.3 (17.1)	1.2 (34.2)	7.2 (45.0)	11.1 (52.0)	6.8 (44.2)	0.6 (33.1)	−8.4 (16.9)	−18.0 (−0.4)	−24.7 (−12.5)	−32.7 (−26.9)
Average precipitation mm (inches)	0.5 (0.02)	0.4 (0.02)	0.2 (0.01)	0.7 (0.03)	3.7 (0.15)	9.8 (0.39)	5.4 (0.21)	3.5 (0.14)	0.7 (0.03)	0.7 (0.03)	0.1 (0.00)	0.1 (0.00)	25.8 (1.03)
Average precipitation days (≥ 0.1 mm)	0.8	0.3	0.3	0.3	1.8	3.5	3.5	1.8	0.8	0.4	0.1	0.6	14.2
Average snowy days	2.7	1.1	0	0	0	0	0	0	0	0	0.3	2.8	6.9
Average relative humidity (%)	55	40	23	20	24	29	30	28	29	34	45	56	34
Mean monthly sunshine hours	188.5	191.2	220.7	222.0	251.4	240.6	246.8	246.3	253.9	262.7	216.9	184.1	2,725.1
Percentage possible sunshine	62	62	59	55	56	54	55	59	69	78	73	63	62
Source: China Meteorological Administration

== Administrative divisions ==
Qiemo (Qarqan) County includes 6 towns and 7 townships:

Name	Simplified Chinese	Hanyu Pinyin	Uyghur (UEY)	Uyghur Latin (ULY)	Mongolian (traditional)	Mongolian (Cyrillic)	Administrative division code	Notes
Towns
Qiemo Town (Qarqan)	且末镇	Qiěmò Zhèn	چەرچەن بازىرى	cherchen baziri			652825100	
Oyyaylak Town	奥依亚依拉克镇	Àoyīyàyīlākè Zhèn	ئوييايلاق بازىرى	Oyyaylaq baziri			652825101	formerly Oyyaylak Township (奥依亚依拉克乡)
Tatirang Town	塔提让镇	Tǎtíràng Zhèn	تاتىراڭ بازىرى	tatirang baziri			652825102	formerly Tatirang Township (塔提让乡)
Tazhong Town (Tarim Ottura Town)	塔中镇	Tǎzhōng Zhèn	تارىم ئوتتۇرا بازىرى	tarim Ottura baziri			652825103	
Aqqan Town (Aqiang, A-ch'iang)	阿羌镇	Āqiāng Zhèn	ئاچچان بازىرى	Achchan baziri			652825104	formerly Aqqan Township (阿羌乡)
Aral Town	阿热勒镇	Ārèlè Zhèn	ئارال بازىرى	Aral baziri			652825105	formerly Aral Township (阿热勒乡)
Townships
Qongkol Township	琼库勒乡	Qiōngkùlè Xiāng	چوڭكۆل يېزىسى	chongköl yëzisi			652825201	
Tograklik Township	托格拉克勒克乡	Tuōgélākè Xiāng	توغراقلىق يېزىسى	toghraqliq yëzisi			652825202	
Bagerik Township	巴格艾日克乡	Bāgé'àirìkè Xiāng	باغئېرىق يېزىسى	bagh'ëriq yëzisi			652825203	
Yengiostang Township	英吾斯塘乡	Yīngwúsītáng Xiāng	يېڭىئۆستەڭ يېزىسى	yëngi'östeng yëzisi			652825204	
Aktikandong Township	阿克提坎墩乡	Ākètíkǎndūn Xiāng	ئاق تېكەندۆڭ يېزىسى	Aq tëkendöng yëzisi			652825205	
Koxsatma Township	阔什萨特玛乡	Kuòshísàtèmǎ Xiāng	قوشساتما يېزىسى	qoshsatma yëzisi			652825206	
Koramlik Township	库拉木勒克乡	Kùlāmùlèkè Xiāng	قوراملىق يېزىسى	qoramliq yëzisi			652825209	

== Economy ==
The economy of the county is primarily based on agriculture and animal husbandry. Agricultural products of the county include wheat, corn, cotton and rapeseed. Lynx and fox hunting in the county produces valuable animal skins. Mining in the county includes coal, jade and asbestos. Industries in the county include mining, leather making, and grain and oil processing.

== Demographics ==
As of 2015, 50,754 (73.06%) of the 69,464 residents of the county were Uyghur, 18,365 (26.44%) were Han Chinese and 345 were from other ethnic groups.

As of 1999, 77.5% of the population of the county was Uyghur and 22.31% of the population was Han Chinese.

The proportion of nationalities in Qiemo (Qarqan) County, 2018
Nationality	Percentage
Uyghurs	72.9%
Han People	26.6%
Hui People	0.2%
Others	0.3%
Source of the population statistics :

== Transportation ==
- Qiemo Yudu Airport
- China National Highway 315
- Qiemo railway station on Hotan–Ruoqiang railway

== Notable persons ==
- Mihrigul Tursun, Xinjiang re-education camp detainee
- Cherchen Man, one of the Tarim mummies

== Historical maps ==
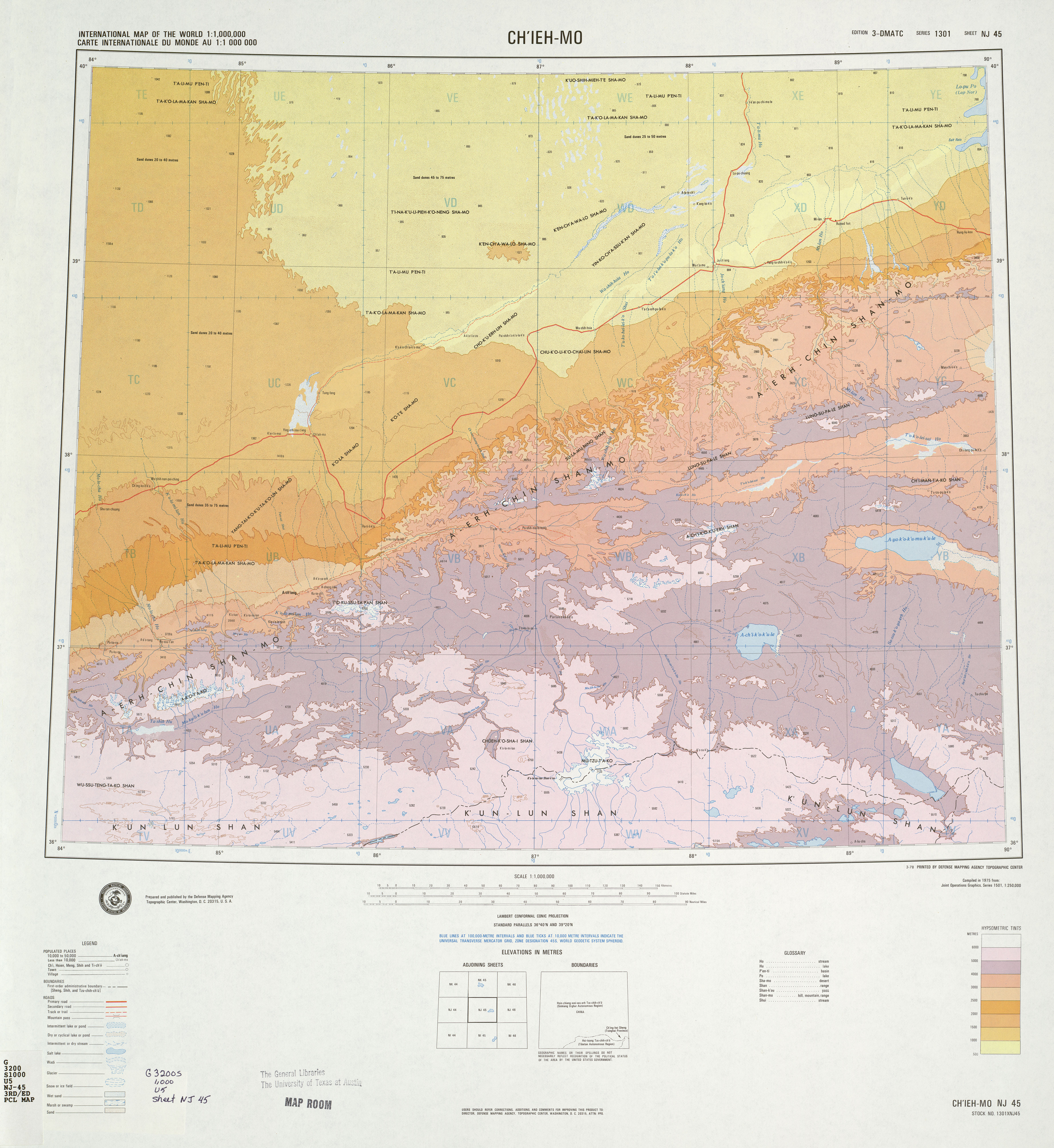
Map of Qiemo (labeled as Ch'ieh-mo) and surrounding area (1975)

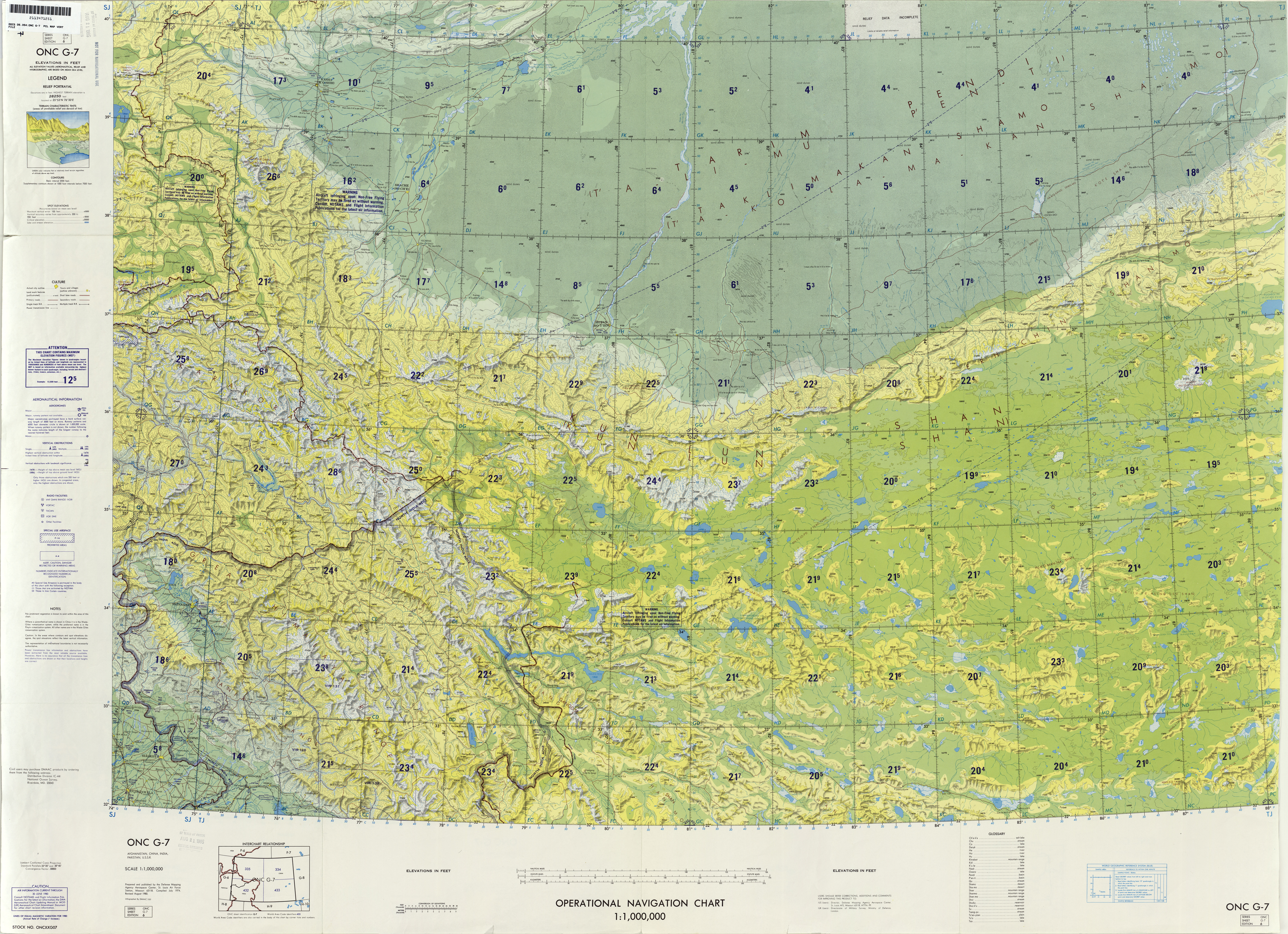
Map including Qiemo (labeled as QIEMO (CH'IEH-MO)) and surrounding region (DMA, 1980) (Note: From map: "The representation of international boundaries is not necessarily authoritative.")

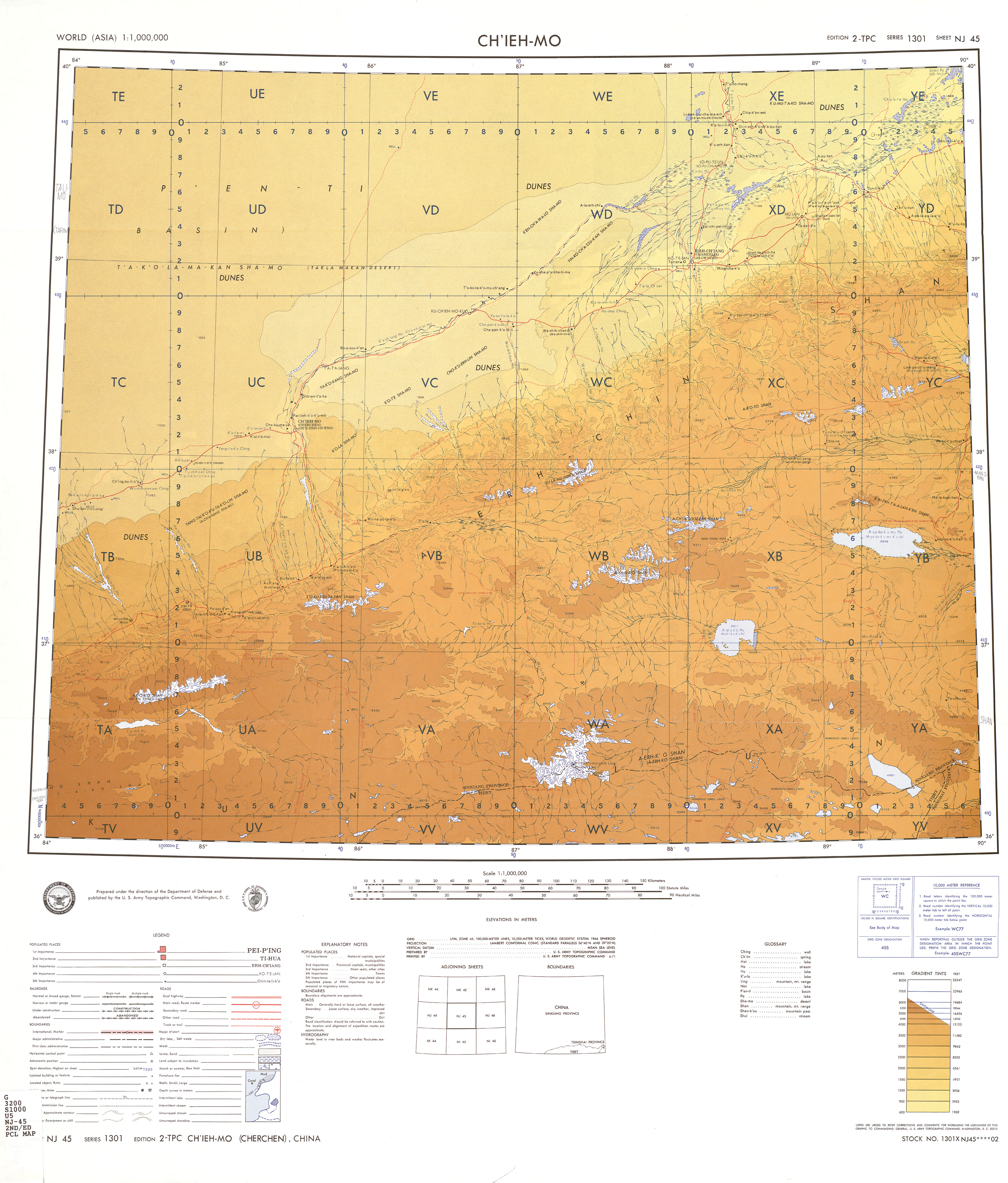
Map including Qarqan (labeled as CH'IEH-MO (CHERCHEN) (CH'E-ERH-CH'ENG)) (USATC, 1971)
