= Qiemo Town =

Qiemo چەرچەن 且末 Qarqan
- County-level town
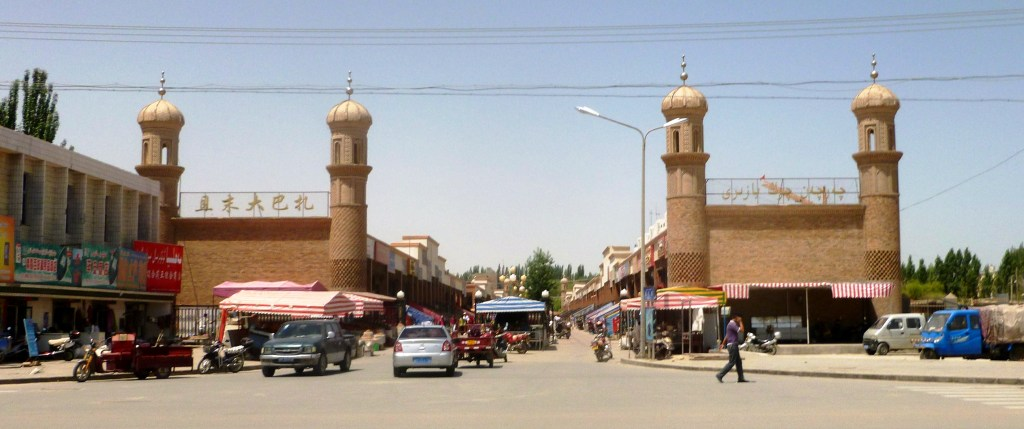

- Location in Xinjiang
- Coordinates: 38°08′04″N 85°31′49″E
- Country: China
- Province: Xinjiang
- Prefecture: Bayingolin Mongol Autonomous Prefecture
- County: Qiemo
- Elevation: 1,252 m (4,108 ft)

Population
  - Total: 18,893

Ethnic groups
  - Major ethnic groups: Uyghur
- Time zone: UTC+8 (China Standard)
- Postal code: 841900

The oasis town of Qiemo or Cherchen (Uyghur: چەرچەن, Чәрчән, Chinese: 且末; pinyin: Qiěmò; Uighur: Qarqan, also spelled Charchan) is the capital of Qiemo County, Bayingolin Mongol Autonomous Prefecture, Xinjiang, China. It is on the Qiemo River and at the foot of the Qilian Mountains, on the Southern Silk Route. In ancient times, the town and the kingdom it controlled were jointly known as Shanshan.

== History ==
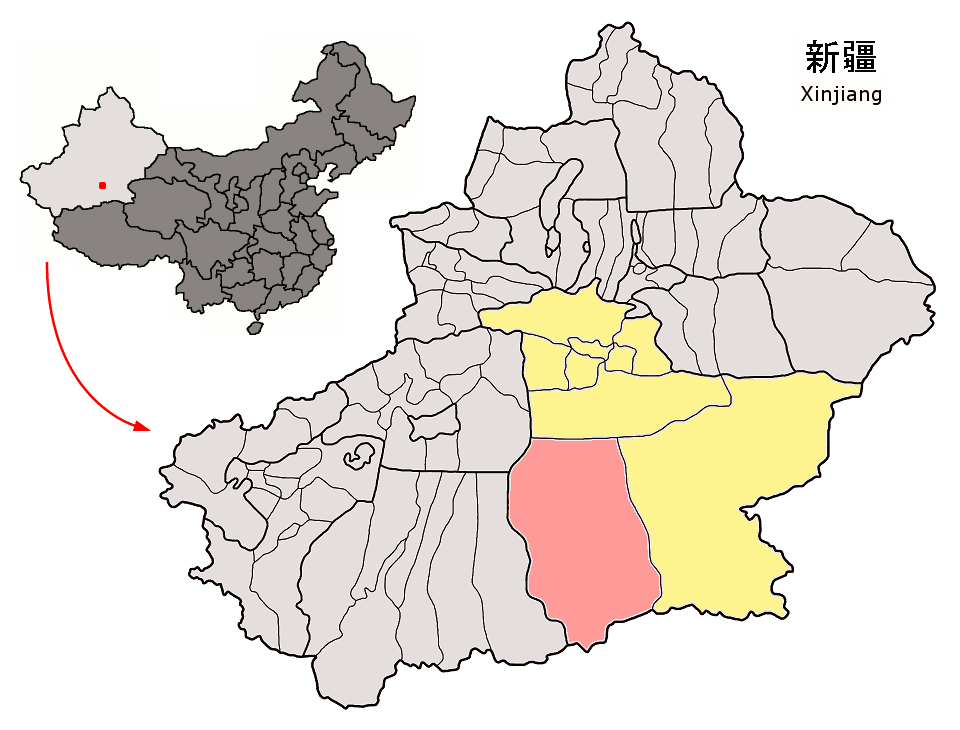
Location of Qiemo county (pink), in Bayin'gholin prefecture (yellow), in Xinjiang autonomous region of China

Settlement in the Qiemo area dates back to the Bronze Age. The town is located along the ancient Jade Road that traded with the earliest Chinese dynasties, and Bronze Age rock carvings were found south of town along another ancient trade route to what is now Tibet. Mummies dated to 1,000 BCE were discovered at the Zaghunluq site less than six km southwest of the city center. A particularly well-preserved one is known as the Cherchen Man.

Qiemo existed as an independent kingdom during the Former Han dynasty (123 BCE to 23 CE). It was described in the Hanshu, chapter 96A thus:

The seat of the government is the town of Ch'ieh-mo, and it is distant by 6820 li from Chang'an. There are 230 households, 1610 individuals with 320 persons able to bear arms. [There are the following officials:] the noble of Fu-kuo (support of the state), the leaders of the left and the right and one interpreter-in-chief ... There are grapes and various types of fruit. To the west there is communication with Ching-chüeh at a distance of 2000 li."

— Hanshu, chapter 96a, translation from Hulsewé 1979.

Although the town is described in documents from the 1st century BCE to the 9th century CE, the ancient site has not yet been discovered, even though four major expeditions have searched for it.

The area was ruled as the kingdom of Calmadana during the earliest heyday of the Silk Road. Its fortunes have since ebbed and flowed, mainly with the popularity of the southern trade route. The Chinese Buddhist monk Faxian left a brief account of the country after his visit c. 399 CE, recording that there were probably more than 4,000 monks in the country, all Hinayana. Song Yun passed through around 519, and wrote that the country had just been defeated by the Tuyuhun. It was sometimes abandoned, as when Buddhist monk Xuanzang passed through in the year 644, and when Marco Polo came by in 1273.

In 2018, Jiayuan was newly listed as a residential community.

== Geography ==
Qiemo was strategically located at the junction of the main route from Dunhuang to Khotan via Jingjue and the mountain route to Xining via Qinghai Lake. Qiemo is 315 km east of Minfeng, 605 km east of Hotan, and 351 km west of Charklik/Ruoqiang Town along Highway 315.

== Administrative divisions ==
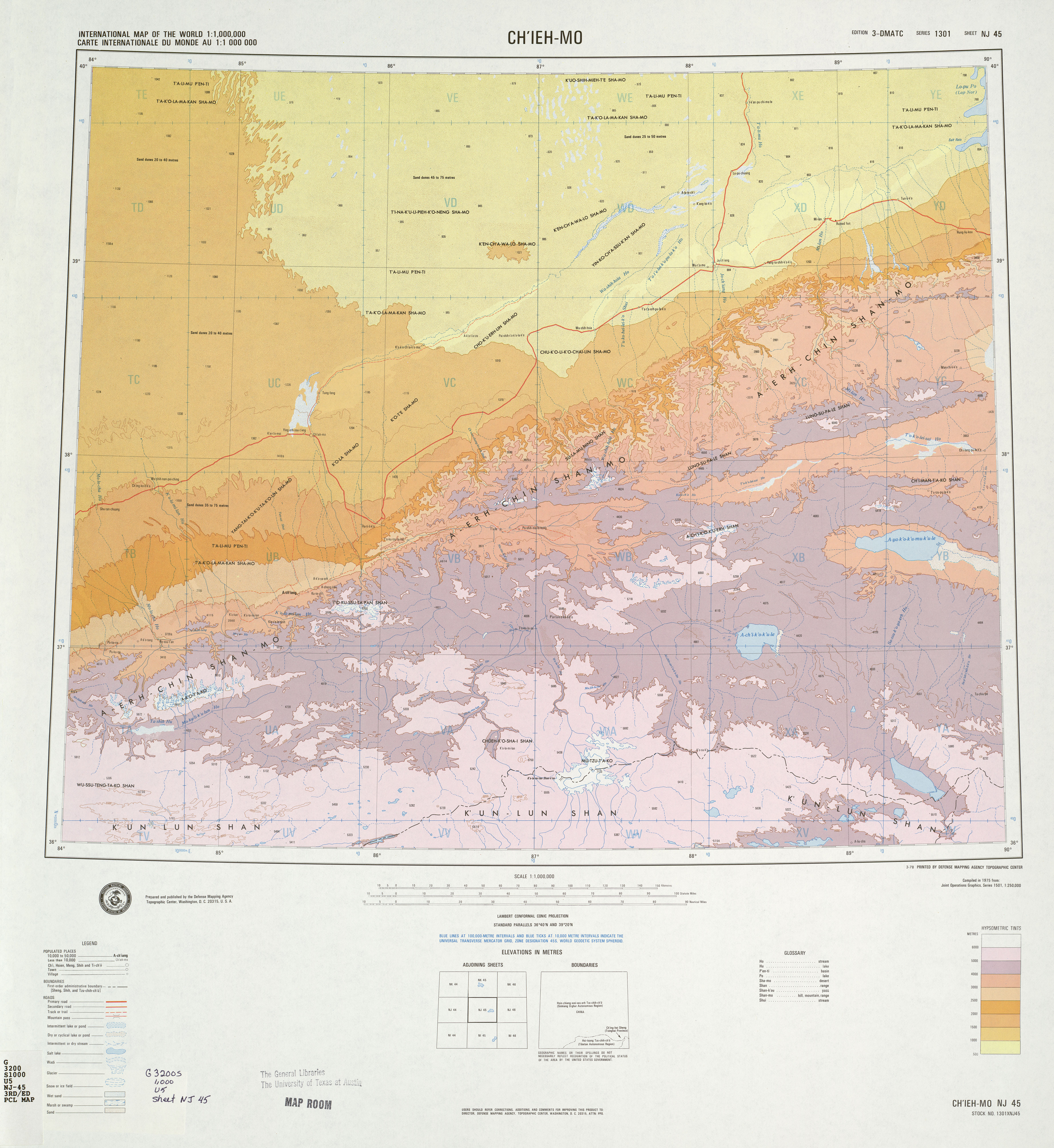
Map including Qiemo (labeled as Ch'ieh-mo) from the International Map of the World (DMA, 1975)

The town is made up of six residential communities and one village:

Residential Communities (Mandarin Chinese Hanyu Pinyin-derived names):

- Quegelimaya (却格里买亚社区), Gulukawuruke (古路卡吾入克社区, formerly Gulekeruike (古勒科瑞克社区)), Jiahabage (加哈巴格社区), Ketaimai (科台买社区, formerly Ketaiman (科台满社区)), Dianshi Xincun (Dianshixincun; 电视新村社区), Jiayuan (佳园社区)

Village:

- Caidui (菜队村)

== Transportation ==
- Qiemo is well-serviced with buses from the modern bus station just south of the city center, with routes west to Hotan, east to Ruoqiang and north to Korla.
- Qiemo Airport is located 13 km northeast of the city center. China Southern Airlines operates flights, usually twice per week, to and from Urumqi via Korla.
- Qiemo railway station serves on the Hotan–Ruoqiang railway.

== See also ==
- List of township-level divisions of Xinjiang
