= Qiemo Yudu Airport =

Qiemo Yudu Airport 且末玉都机场
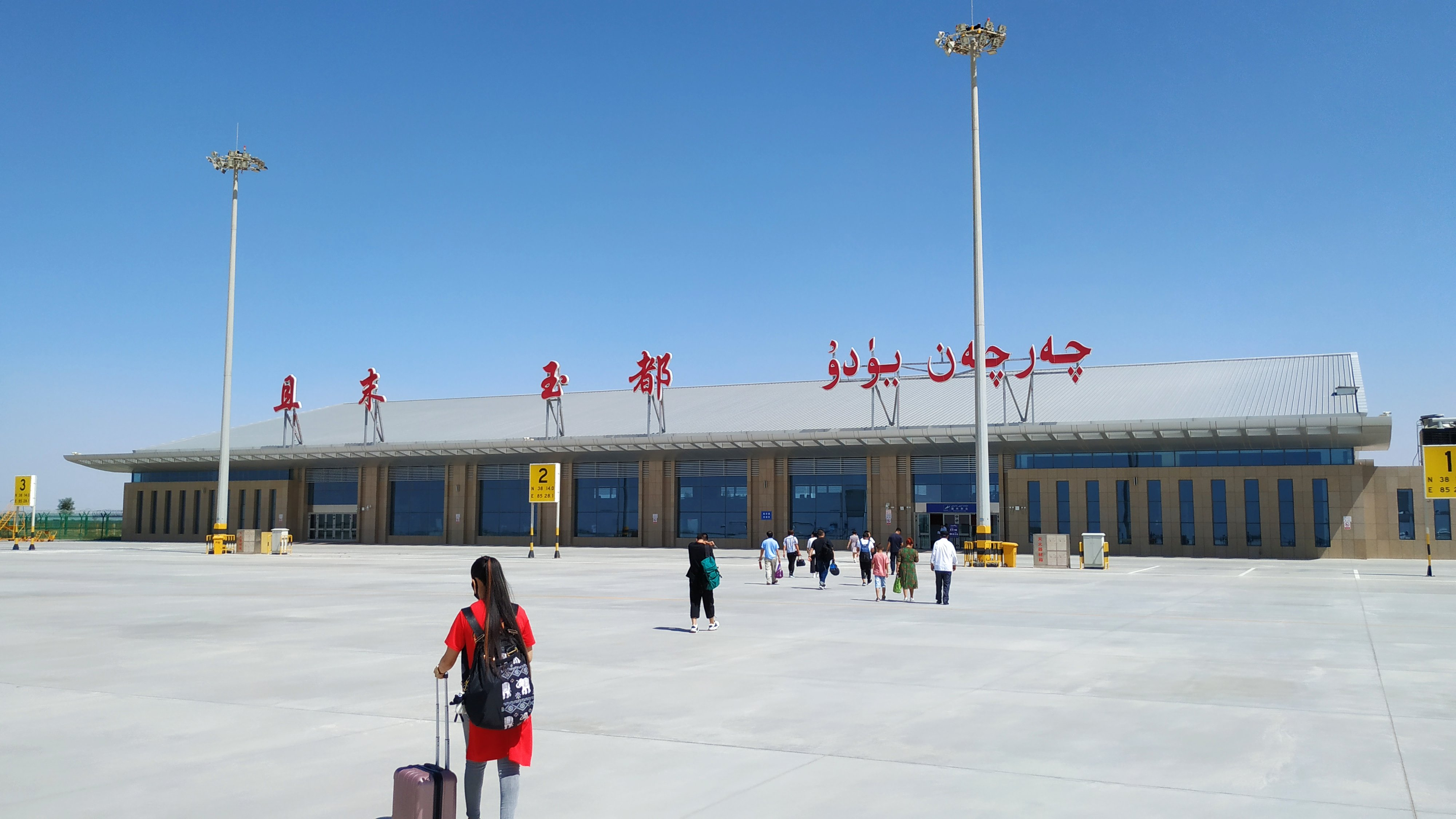
- IATA: IQM; ICAO: ZWCM

Summary
- Airport type: Public
- Operator: Civil Aviation Administration of China
- Serves: Qiemo Town, Xinjiang, China
- Coordinates: 38°14′1″N 85°27′56″E

Map
- Location of airport in Xinjiang

Runways
Direction	Length		Surface
Direction	m	ft	Surface
04/22	2,800	9,186	paved

Statistics (2021)
- Passengers: 129,194
- Aircraft movements: 2,148
- Cargo (metric tons): 29

Qiemo Yudu Airport
- Simplified Chinese: 且末玉都机场
- Traditional Chinese: 且末玉都機場
Transcriptions
Standard Mandarin
- Hanyu Pinyin: Qiěmò Yùdū Jīchǎng

Qiemo Yudu Airport (IATA: IQM, ICAO: ZWCM) is an airport that serves Qiemo Town in Xinjiang Uyghur Autonomous Region, China. Located roughly 13 kilometres (8.1 mi) northwest of the town, the airport has a 4,500-square-metre (48,000 sq ft) terminal and a runway that measures 2,800 metres (9,200 ft). It replaced another airport serving the town, which has a shorter runway, on 19 December 2016. China Southern Airlines offers flights to Ürümqi via Korla.

== History ==
In January 2011, civil aviation officials in Xinjiang announced plans to build a new airport for Qiemo Town, part of a wider scheme to invest in airport construction in the region between 2011 and 2015. Qiemo County officials stated in March 2013 that construction would begin in June. Qiemo Yudu Airport was built in two years at a cost of ¥588 million. Located about 13 kilometres (8.1 mi) northwest of Qiemo Town, the airport replaces another airport serving the town, which has a shorter runway.

China Southern Airlines operated a test flight to the airport on 26 August 2016. It opened on 19 December 2016; China Southern commenced flights to Ürümqi via Korla five times a week. The flights mark the resumption of commercial air service to Qiemo Town, which ended at the old airport in 2011. China Daily reported in December 2016 that China Southern will receive annual government subsidies of about ¥7 million for operating the flights.

== Infrastructure ==
Qiemo Yudu Airport has a 4,500-square-metre (48,000 sq ft) terminal that can handle 120,000 passengers per year. The airport can also process 480 tonnes (530 short tons) of cargo annually. The runway has dimensions 2,800 by 45 metres (9,186 ft × 148 ft).

== Airlines and destinations ==
Airlines	Destinations
Chengdu Airlines	Kuqa, Turpan
China Express Airlines	Hotan, Korla, Ruoqiang
